= 2020–21 Eastern Kentucky Colonels men's basketball team =

American college basketball season

2020–21 Eastern Kentucky Colonels men's basketball
- Conference: Ohio Valley Conference
- Record: 22–7 (15–5 OVC)
- Head coach: A. W. Hamilton (3rd season)
- Assistant coaches: Steve Lepore; Mike Allen; Patrick Blake
- Home arena: McBrayer Arena

2020–21 Ohio Valley Conference men's basketball standings
| | Conf. | | | | Overall |
| Team | W | | L | PCT | W | | L | PCT |
|---|---|---|---|---|---|---|---|---|
| Belmont | 18 | – | 2 | .900 | 26 | – | 4 | .867 |
| Morehead State † | 17 | – | 3 | .850 | 23 | – | 8 | .742 |
| Eastern Kentucky | 15 | – | 5 | .750 | 22 | – | 7 | .759 |
| Jacksonville State | 13 | – | 6 | .684 | 18 | – | 9 | .667 |
| Austin Peay | 10 | – | 10 | .500 | 14 | – | 13 | .519 |
| Murray State | 10 | – | 10 | .500 | 13 | – | 13 | .500 |
| Southeast Missouri State | 9 | – | 11 | .450 | 11 | – | 16 | .407 |
| SIU Edwardsville | 7 | – | 12 | .368 | 9 | – | 17 | .346 |
| Eastern Illinois | 6 | – | 14 | .300 | 9 | – | 18 | .333 |
| UT Martin | 6 | – | 14 | .300 | 8 | – | 16 | .333 |
| Tennessee Tech | 5 | – | 15 | .250 | 5 | – | 22 | .185 |
| Tennessee State | 3 | – | 17 | .150 | 4 | – | 19 | .174 |
† 2021 OVC tournament winner

The 2020–21 Eastern Kentucky Colonels men's basketball team represented Eastern Kentucky University in the 2020–21 NCAA Division I men's basketball season. The Colonels, led by third-year head coach A. W. Hamilton, played their home games at McBrayer Arena within Alumni Coliseum in Richmond, Kentucky in their 73rd and final season as members of the Ohio Valley Conference (OVC). Eastern Kentucky joined the ASUN Conference on July 1, 2021.

== Previous season ==
The Colonels finished the 2019–20 season 16–17, 12–6 in OVC play, to finish in fourth place. They defeated Tennessee State in the quarterfinals, before losing to Belmont in the semifinals.

== Roster ==
2020–21 Eastern Kentucky Colonels men's basketball team
Players
Coaches

| Pos. | # | Name | Height | Weight | Year | Previous school | Hometown |
|---|---|---|---|---|---|---|---|
| G | 0 | Russhard Cruickshank | 6 ft 0 in (1.83 m) | 175 lb (79 kg) | Sr | Garden City CC | Milwaukee, WI |
| G | 1 | JacQuess Hobbs | 6 ft 2 in (1.88 m) | 185 lb (84 kg) | Sr | Waggener HS | Louisville, KY |
| F | 2 | Tre King | 6 ft 9 in (2.06 m) | 225 lb (102 kg) | Jr | Hargrave Military Academy | Lexington, KY |
| G | 3 | Peyton Broughton | 6 ft 5 in (1.96 m) | 195 lb (88 kg) | RS Jr | North Laurel HS | London, KY |
| G | 4 | Curt Lewis | 6 ft 5 in (1.96 m) | 220 lb (100 kg) | RS Fr | Aspire Academy | Louisville, KY |
| G | 5 | Cooper Robb | 6 ft 1 in (1.85 m) | 190 lb (86 kg) | Jr | UNC Charlotte | Georgetown, KY |
| G | 10 | Brandon Knapper | 6 ft 0 in (1.83 m) | 190 lb (86 kg) | Jr | West Virginia | Ontario, CA |
| G | 11 | Jomaru Brown | 6 ft 2 in (1.88 m) | 190 lb (86 kg) | Jr | Southern Durham HS | Raleigh, NC |
| G | 12 | Wendell Green Jr. | 5 ft 11 in (1.8 m) | 170 lb (77 kg) | Fr | La Lumiere School | Detroit, MI |
| F | 13 | Tariq Balogun | 6 ft 10 in (2.08 m) | 225 lb (102 kg) | So | Miller School of Albemarle | London, England |
| G/F | 14 | Devontae Blanton | 6 ft 6 in (1.98 m) | 215 lb (98 kg) | Fr | St. Edward HS | Macedonia, OH |
| G | 15 | Isaiah Minter | 5 ft 11 in (1.8 m) | 170 lb (77 kg) | RS So | Union College | Richmond, KY |
| G | 20 | Caleb Mitchell | 6 ft 0 in (1.83 m) | 160 lb (73 kg) | Fr | South Warren HS | Louisville, KY |
| G | 22 | Matt Cromer | 6 ft 2 in (1.88 m) | 185 lb (84 kg) | Fr | North Laurel HS | London, KY |
| G | 23 | Cameron Carmical | 5 ft 10 in (1.78 m) | 165 lb (75 kg) | Sr | Harlan County HS | Harlan, KY |
| F | 24 | Michael Moreno | 6 ft 7 in (2.01 m) | 220 lb (100 kg) | So | Scott County HS | Georgetown, KY |
| G | 30 | Jordan Reeves-Young | 6 ft 3 in (1.91 m) | 170 lb (77 kg) | So | Uncommon Charter HS | Brooklyn, NY |
| G/F | 34 | Cheikh Faye | 6 ft 7 in (2.01 m) | 210 lb (95 kg) | Jr | Chipola College | Fatick, Senegal |
| F | 35 | Rabby Kamona | 6 ft 9 in (2.06 m) | 235 lb (107 kg) | Fr | Paul Laurence Dunbar HS | Kinshasa, DR Congo |

Head coach

- A. W. Hamilton (Marshall)

Assistant coach(es)

- Steve Lepore (Wake Forest)
- Mike Allen (Ohio)
- Patrick Blake (Louisville)

Legend

- (C) Team captain
- (S) Suspended
- (I) Ineligible
- (W) Walk-on
- Injured
- Current redshirt

Roster
Last update: December 18, 2020

== Schedule and results ==
| Date time, TV | Rank^{#} | Opponent^{#} | Result | Record | Site (attendance) city, state |
Regular season
| November 25, 2020*; 5:30 p.m. | | vs. North Florida; Mako Medical Wolfpack Invitational | W 80–67 | 1–0 | Reynolds Coliseum; Raleigh, NC |
| November 27, 2020*; 2:00 p.m. | | vs. Charleston Southern; Mako Medical Wolfpack Invitational | W 60–50 | 2–0 | Reynolds Coliseum; Raleigh, NC |
| November 30, 2020*; 7:00 p.m., FS1 | | at Xavier | L 96–99 ^{OT} | 2–1 | Cintas Center (300); Cincinnati, OH |
| December 2, 2020*; 5:30 p.m., ESPN+ | | at USC Upstate | W 95–78 | 3–1 | G. B. Hodge Center (142); Spartanburg, SC |
| December 7, 2020; 7:00 p.m., ESPN+ | | Morehead State | W 71–68 | 4–1 (1–0) | McBrayer Arena (643); Richmond, KY |
| December 12, 2020*; 4:00 p.m., ESPN+ | | Transylvania | W 81–60 | 5–1 | McBrayer Arena (609); Richmond, KY |
| December 14, 2020; 6:00 p.m., ESPN+ | | at Morehead State | L 62–75 | 5–2 (1–1) | Ellis Johnson Arena (565); Morehead, KY |
| December 17, 2020*; 7:00 p.m., ESPN+ | | Campbellsville–Harrodsburg | W 118–54 | 6–2 | McBrayer Arena (500); Richmond, KY |
| December 22, 2020*; 7:00 p.m., ESPN+ | | High Point | W 86–67 | 7–2 | McBrayer Arena (723); Richmond, KY |
| December 30, 2020; 8:00 p.m., ESPN+ | | Eastern Illinois | W 69–61 | 8–2 (2–1) | McBrayer Arena (704); Richmond, KY |
| January 2, 2021; 5:00 p.m., ESPN+ | | at Austin Peay | W 80–75 | 9–2 (3–1) | Dunn Center (452); Clarksville, TN |
| January 7, 2021; 8:00 p.m., ESPN+ | | Jacksonville State | W 69–66 ^{OT} | 10–2 (4–1) | McBrayer Arena (672); Richmond, KY |
| January 9, 2021; 7:00 p.m., ESPN+ | | Tennessee Tech | W 90–80 | 11–2 (5–1) | McBrayer Arena (733); Richmond, KY |
| January 16, 2021; 5:00 p.m., ESPN+ | | at Eastern Illinois | W 93–85 ^{OT} | 12–2 (6–1) | Lantz Arena; Charleston, IL |
| January 21, 2021; 8:00 p.m., ESPN+ | | UT Martin | W 113–73 | 13–2 (7–1) | McBrayer Arena (759); Richmond, KY |
| February 2, 2021; 7:00 p.m., ESPN+ | | at Jacksonville State | W 86–82 ^{OT} | 14–2 (8–1) | Pete Mathews Coliseum (402); Jacksonville, AL |
| February 4, 2021; 8:00 p.m., ESPN+ | | Austin Peay | L 79–94 | 14–3 (8–2) | McBrayer Arena (902); Richmond, KY |
| February 6, 2021; 4:00 p.m., ESPN+ | | Murray State | L 64–76 | 14–4 (8–3) | McBrayer Arena (887); Richmond, KY |
| February 8, 2021; 3:00 p.m., ESPN+ | | at SIU Edwardsville | W 78–74 | 15–4 (9–3) | First Community Arena (22); Edwardsville, IL |
| February 11, 2021; 8:00 p.m., ESPN+ | | at Belmont | L 74–92 | 15–5 (9–4) | Curb Event Center (241); Nashville, TN |
| February 13, 2021; 5:00 p.m., ESPN+ | | at Tennessee State | W 93–73 | 16–5 (10–4) | Gentry Complex (255); Nashville, TN |
| February 15, 2021; 9:00 p.m., ESPN+ | | at Tennessee Tech | W 83–72 | 17–5 (11–4) | Eblen Center (238); Cookeville, TN |
| February 18, 2021; 5:00 p.m., ESPN+ | | at UT Martin | W 89–72 | 18–5 (12–4) | Skyhawk Arena (173); Martin, TN |
| February 20, 2021; 6:00 p.m., ESPN+ | | at Southeast Missouri State | L 72–94 | 18–6 (12–5) | Show Me Center (753); Cape Girardeau, MO |
| February 22, 2021; 7:00 p.m., ESPN+ | | at Southeast Missouri State | W 87–65 | 19–6 (13–5) | Show Me Center (289); Cape Girardeau, MO |
| February 25, 2021; 8:00 p.m., ESPN+ | | Belmont | W 81–67 | 20–6 (14–5) | McBrayer Arena (957); Richmond, KY |
| February 27, 2021; 7:00 p.m., ESPN+ | | Tennessee State | W 89–84 | 21–6 (15–5) | McBrayer Arena (971); Richmond, KY |
Ohio Valley tournament
| March 4, 2021; 10:30 p.m., ESPN+ | (3) | vs. (6) Austin Peay; First round | W 70–67 | 22–6 | Ford Center (645); Evansville, IN |
| March 5, 2021; 10:30 p.m., ESPNU | (3) | vs. (2) Morehead State; Semifinals | L 64–67 | 22–7 | Ford Center (627); Evansville, IN |
*Non-conference game. ^{#}Rankings from AP poll. (#) Tournament seedings in parentheses. All times are in Eastern.
