= 2020–21 Tennessee Tech Golden Eagles men's basketball team =

American college basketball season

2020–21 Tennessee Tech Golden Eagles men's basketball
- Conference: Ohio Valley Conference
- Record: 5–22 (5–15 OVC)
- Head coach: John Pelphrey (2nd season)
- Assistant coaches: Andre Bell; Alex Fain; Marcus King
- Home arena: Eblen Center

2020–21 Ohio Valley Conference men's basketball standings
	Conf.				Overall
Team	W		L	PCT	W		L	PCT
Belmont	18	–	2	.900	26	–	4	.867
Morehead State †	17	–	3	.850	23	–	8	.742
Eastern Kentucky	15	–	5	.750	22	–	7	.759
Jacksonville State	13	–	6	.684	18	–	9	.667
Austin Peay	10	–	10	.500	14	–	13	.519
Murray State	10	–	10	.500	13	–	13	.500
Southeast Missouri State	9	–	11	.450	11	–	16	.407
SIU Edwardsville	7	–	12	.368	9	–	17	.346
Eastern Illinois	6	–	14	.300	9	–	18	.333
UT Martin	6	–	14	.300	8	–	16	.333
Tennessee Tech	5	–	15	.250	5	–	22	.185
Tennessee State	3	–	17	.150	4	–	19	.174
† 2021 OVC tournament winner

The 2020–21 Tennessee Tech Golden Eagles men's basketball team represented Tennessee Technological University in the 2020–21 NCAA Division I men's basketball season. The Golden Eagles, led by second-year head coach John Pelphrey, played their home games at the Eblen Center in Cookeville, Tennessee as members of the Ohio Valley Conference (OVC).

== Previous season ==
The Golden Eagles finished the 2019–20 season 9–22, 6–12 in OVC play, to finish in ninth place. They failed to qualify for the OVC tournament.

== Roster ==
2020–21 Tennessee Tech Golden Eagles men's basketball team
Players
Coaches

Pos.	#	Name	Height	Weight	Year	Previous school	Hometown
G	0	Damaria Franklin	6 ft 4 in (1.93 m)	210 lb (95 kg)	Jr	State Fair CC	Chicago, IL
G	1	Maverick Smith	6 ft 5 in (1.96 m)	190 lb (86 kg)	Sr	Oakdale HS (TN)	Oakdale, TN
G	2	Taelon Peter	6 ft 4 in (1.93 m)	185 lb (84 kg)	Fr	Russellville HS	Russellville, AR
G	3	Keishawn Davidson	6 ft 2 in (1.88 m)	175 lb (79 kg)	So	Athens Prep Academy	Murfreesboro, TN
G	4	Jr. Clay	6 ft 0 in (1.83 m)	170 lb (77 kg)	Jr	The McCallie School	Chattanooga, TN
C	5	Marcus Hopkins	7 ft 0 in (2.13 m)	230 lb (104 kg)	Jr	Daytona State College	Oakland, CA
G	10	CJ Gettelfinger	6 ft 4 in (1.93 m)	185 lb (84 kg)	So	Oakland	Knoxville, TN
G	11	Dane Quest	6 ft 6 in (1.98 m)	190 lb (86 kg)	So	Lake Forest HS	Toronto, ON
F	12	Amadou Sylla	6 ft 8 in (2.03 m)	235 lb (107 kg)	Jr	Iowa Western CC	Bamako, Mali
F	13	Kenny White Jr.	6 ft 7 in (2.01 m)	205 lb (93 kg)	Fr	Madisonville North Hopkins HS	Madisonville, KY
F	15	Jalen Stayton	6 ft 8 in (2.03 m)	205 lb (93 kg)	Fr	Blackman HS	Murfreesboro, TN
G	22	Tujautae Williams	6 ft 5 in (1.96 m)	190 lb (86 kg)	So	Orr Academy HS	Chicago, IL
F	23	Austin Harvell	6 ft 6 in (1.98 m)	215 lb (98 kg)	Fr	East Limestone HS	Athens, AL
G	30	Jamaal Thompson	5 ft 10 in (1.78 m)	185 lb (84 kg)	Jr	East Tennessee State	Hendersonville, TN
F	33	Shandon Goldman	6 ft 10 in (2.08 m)	225 lb (102 kg)	GS	Northern Iowa	Evansville, AR

Head coach

- John Pelphrey (Kentucky)

Assistant coach(es)

- Andre Bell (Bemidji State)
- Alex Fain (Alabama)
- Marcus King (Northeastern State)

Legend

- (C) Team captain
- (S) Suspended
- (I) Ineligible
- (W) Walk-on
- Injured
- Current redshirt

Roster
Last update: January 1, 2021

== Schedule and results ==
Date time, TV	Rank^{#}	Opponent^{#}	Result	Record	Site (attendance) city, state
Regular season
November 25, 2020*; 7:00 p.m., BTN		at Indiana	L 59–89	0–1	Simon Skjodt Assembly Hall (125); Bloomington, IN
November 30, 2020*; 6:00 p.m., ESPN+		Chattanooga	L 54–62	0–2	Eblen Center (644); Cookeville, TN
December 2, 2020*; 6:00 p.m., FS1		at Xavier	L 48–79	0–3	Cintas Center (300); Cincinnati, OH
December 3, 2020*; 5:00 p.m., ESPN3		at Northern Kentucky	L 65–74	0–4	BB&T Arena; Highland Heights, KY
December 6, 2020*; 11:00 a.m., ESPN+		at Western Carolina	L 75–76 ^{OT}	0–5	Ramsey Center; Cullowhee, NC
December 13, 2020; 4:00 p.m., ESPN+		Jacksonville State	L 67–73	0–6 (0–1)	Eblen Center (624); Cookeville, TN
December 16, 2020; 7:30 p.m., ESPN+		at Jacksonville State	L 60–74	0–7 (0–2)	Pete Mathews Coliseum; Jacksonville, AL
December 18, 2020*; 6:00 p.m., SECN+		at No. 10 Tennessee	L 49–103	0–8	Thompson–Boling Arena (4,191); Knoxville, TN
December 22, 2020*; 6:00 p.m., ESPNU		at Western Kentucky	L 68–88	0–9	E. A. Diddle Arena (1,061); Bowling Green, KY
December 30, 2020; 8:00 p.m., ESPN+		Southeast Missouri State	W 72–63	1–9 (1–2)	Eblen Center (430); Cookeville, TN
January 2, 2021; 4:00 p.m., ESPN+		at Eastern Illinois	L 81–87	1–10 (1–3)	Lantz Arena; Charleston, IL
January 7, 2021; 6:00 p.m., ESPN+		at Morehead State	L 54–57	1–11 (1–4)	Ellis Johnson Arena (480); Morehead, KY
January 9, 2021; 6:00 p.m., ESPN+		at Eastern Kentucky	L 80–90	1–12 (1–5)	McBrayer Arena (733); Richmond, KY
January 14, 2021; 8:00 p.m., ESPN+		Belmont	L 67–88	1–13 (1–6)	Eblen Center (589); Cookeville, TN
January 16, 2021; 8:00 p.m., ESPN+		Tennessee State	W 74–71	2–13 (2–6)	Eblen Center (689); Cookeville, TN
January 21, 2021; 7:30 p.m., ESPN+		at Austin Peay	L 69–72	2–14 (2–7)	Dunn Center (518); Clarksville, TN
January 23, 2021; 7:30 p.m., ESPN+		at Murray State	L 63–72	2–15 (2–8)	CFSB Center (1,290); Murray, KY
January 30, 2021; 4:00 p.m., ESPN+		Morehead State	L 55–74	2–16 (2–9)	Eblen Center (558); Cookeville, TN
February 4, 2021; 8:00 p.m., ESPN+		at Southeast Missouri State	L 64–68	2–17 (2–10)	Show Me Center (642); Cape Girardeau, MO
February 6, 2021; 4:00 p.m., ESPN+		at UT Martin	L 64–66	2–18 (2–11)	Skyhawk Arena (198); Martin, TN
February 11, 2021; 8:00 p.m., ESPN+		SIU Edwardsville	L 63–81	2–19 (2–12)	Eblen Center (534); Cookeville, TN
February 13, 2021; 4:00 p.m., ESPN+		Eastern Illinois	W 80–67	3–19 (3–12)	Eblen Center (550); Cookeville, TN
February 15, 2021; 8:00 p.m., ESPN+		Eastern Kentucky	L 72–83	3–20 (3–13)	Eblen Center (238); Cookeville, TN
February 18, 2021; 8:00 p.m., ESPN+		at Tennessee State	L 86–91	3–21 (3–14)	Gentry Complex (202); Nashville, TN
February 20, 2021; 4:00 p.m., ESPN+		at Belmont	L 66–90	3–22 (3–15)	Curb Event Center (231); Nashville, TN
February 25, 2021; 8:00 p.m., ESPN+		Austin Peay	W 81–76	4–22 (4–15)	Eblen Center (610); Cookeville, TN
February 27, 2021; 8:00 p.m., ESPN+		Murray State	W 71–61	5–22 (5–15)	Eblen Center; Cookeville, TN
*Non-conference game. ^{#}Rankings from AP poll. (#) Tournament seedings in parentheses. All times are in Central.
