= 2020–21 Murray State Racers men's basketball team =

American college basketball season

2020–21 Murray State Racers men's basketball
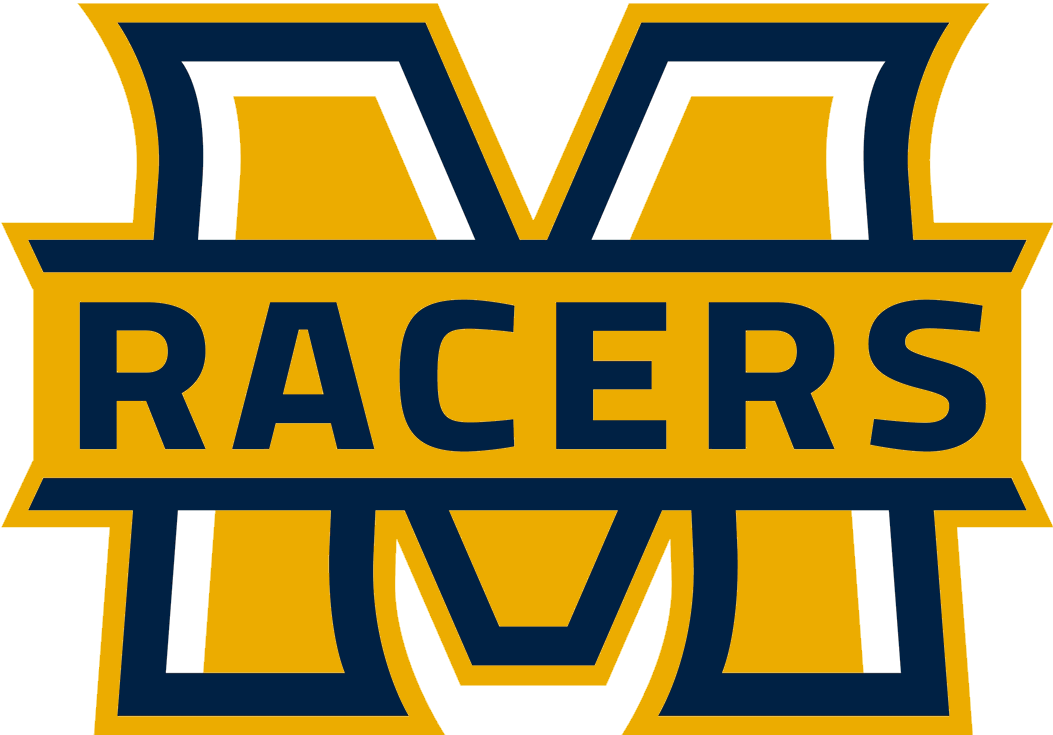
- Conference: Ohio Valley Conference
- Record: 13–13 (10–10 OVC)
- Head coach: Matt McMahon (6th season)
- Assistant coaches: Shane Nichols; Tim Kaine; Casey Long
- Home arena: CFSB Center

2020–21 Ohio Valley Conference men's basketball standings
	Conf.				Overall
Team	W		L	PCT	W		L	PCT
Belmont	18	–	2	.900	26	–	4	.867
Morehead State †	17	–	3	.850	23	–	8	.742
Eastern Kentucky	15	–	5	.750	22	–	7	.759
Jacksonville State	13	–	6	.684	18	–	9	.667
Austin Peay	10	–	10	.500	14	–	13	.519
Murray State	10	–	10	.500	13	–	13	.500
Southeast Missouri State	9	–	11	.450	11	–	16	.407
SIU Edwardsville	7	–	12	.368	9	–	17	.346
Eastern Illinois	6	–	14	.300	9	–	18	.333
UT Martin	6	–	14	.300	8	–	16	.333
Tennessee Tech	5	–	15	.250	5	–	22	.185
Tennessee State	3	–	17	.150	4	–	19	.174
† 2021 OVC tournament winner

The 2020–21 Murray State Racers men's basketball team represented Murray State University during the 2020–21 NCAA Division I men's basketball season. The Racers, led by sixth-year head coach Matt McMahon, played their home games at the CFSB Center in Murray, Kentucky as members of the Ohio Valley Conference.

== Previous season ==
The Racers finished the 2019–20 season 23–9, 15–3 in OVC play to finish in a tie for the OVC regular season championship. They defeated Austin Peay in the semifinals of the OVC tournament to advance to the championship game where they lost to Belmont. With 23 wins, they were a candidate for a postseason bid. However, all postseason tournaments were cancelled amid the COVID-19 pandemic.

== Roster ==
2020–21 Murray State Racers men's basketball team
Players
Coaches

Pos.	#	Name	Height	Weight	Year	Previous school	Hometown
F	0	Demond Robinson	6 ft 8 in (2.03 m)	255 lb (116 kg)	So	Lee HS	Montgomery, AL
G	1	DaQuan Smith	6 ft 1 in (1.85 m)	185 lb (84 kg)	RS So	Holly Springs HS	Holly Springs, MS
G	2	Chico Carter Jr.	6 ft 2 in (1.88 m)	190 lb (86 kg)	So	Cardinal Newman HS	Columbia, SC
G	4	Dionte Bostick	6 ft 2 in (1.88 m)	190 lb (86 kg)	Fr	East Lake HS	Clearwater, FL
G	10	Tevin Brown	6 ft 5 in (1.96 m)	175 lb (79 kg)	RS Jr	Fairhope HS	Fairhope, AL
F	11	Matt Smith	6 ft 6 in (1.98 m)	225 lb (102 kg)	RS Fr	Independence HS	Charlotte, NC
F	13	Devin Gilmore	6 ft 6 in (1.98 m)	200 lb (91 kg)	Sr	Madison-Ridgeland	Picayune, MS
G	14	Justice Hill	6 ft 0 in (1.83 m)	170 lb (77 kg)	So	Little Rock Christian HS; Salt Lake CC	Little Rock, AR
G	22	Brion Whitley	6 ft 4 in (1.93 m)	200 lb (91 kg)	RS Jr	Riverview HS	Sarasota, FL
F	23	KJ Williams	6 ft 10 in (2.08 m)	245 lb (111 kg)	Jr	Cleveland Central HS	Cleveland, MS
F	24	Ja'Queze Kirby	6 ft 6 in (1.98 m)	190 lb (86 kg)	Fr	Jeff Davis HS	Hazlehurst, GA
G	25	Rod Thomas	6 ft 0 in (1.83 m)	185 lb (84 kg)	So	Paducah Tilghman HS	Paducah, KY
F	32	Nicholas McMullen	6 ft 8 in (2.03 m)	235 lb (107 kg)	Fr	Ben L. Smith HS	Greensboro, NC
G	33	Jackson Sivills	6 ft 6 in (1.98 m)	200 lb (91 kg)	Fr	McCracken County HS	Paducah, KY

Head coach

- Matt McMahon (Appalachian State)

Assistant coach(es)

- Shane Nichols (Wofford)
- Tim Kaine (Winthrop)
- Casey Long (Chattanooga)

Legend

- (C) Team captain
- (S) Suspended
- (I) Ineligible
- (W) Walk-on
- Injured
- Current redshirt

Roster
Last update: December 6, 2020

== Schedule and results ==
Date time, TV	Rank^{#}	Opponent^{#}	Result	Record	Site (attendance) city, state
Exhibition
Nov 29, 2020*; 4:00 pm, ESPN+		Greenville	W 173–95	1–0	CFSB Center; Murray, KY
Regular season
Dec 2, 2020*; 6:30 pm		at Middle Tennessee	L 61–78	1–1	Murphy Center; Murfreesboro, TN
Dec 5, 2020*; 5:00 pm, ESPN+		Illinois State	W 76–65	2–1	CFSB Center (1,290); Murray, KY
Dec 8, 2020; 7:30 pm, ESPN+		Austin Peay	W 87–57	3–1 (1–0)	CFSB Center (1,290); Murray, KY
Dec 11, 2020*; 6:30 pm, ESPN3		at Southern Illinois	L 66–70	3–2	Banterra Center; Carbondale, IL
Dec 15, 2020*; 7:00 pm, ESPN+		Transylvania	W 90–49	4–2	CFSB Center; Murray, KY
Dec 21, 2020*; 5:00 pm, ESPNU		at Austin Peay	L 70–74	4–3 (1–1)	Dunn Center (502); Clarksville, TN
Dec 30, 2020; 6:00 pm, ESPNU		at Belmont	L 55–68	4–4 (1–2)	Curb Event Center (756); Nashville, TN
Jan 2, 2021; 4:00 pm, ESPN+		Morehead State	L 56–61	4–5 (1–3)	CFSB Center (872); Murray, KY
Jan 7, 2021*; 7:30 pm		at Eastern Illinois	L 68–74	4–6 (1–4)	Lantz Arena (ESPN+); Charleston, IL
Jan 16, 2021; 4:00 pm, ESPN+		at UT Martin	W 79–57	5–6 (2–4)	Skyhawk Arena (231); Martin, TN
Jan 21, 2021; 7:30 pm, ESPN+		Jacksonville State	L 82–85	5–7 (2–5)	CFSB Center (1,290); Murray, KY
Jan 23, 2021; 7:30 pm, ESPN+		Tennessee Tech	W 72–63	6–7 (3–5)	CFSB Center (1,290); Murray, KY
Jan 28, 2021; 7:30 pm, ESPN+		Tennessee State	W 73–53	7–7 (4–5)	CFSB Center (1,290); Murray, KY
Jan 30, 2021; 7:30 pm, ESPN+		Belmont	L 71–72	7–8 (4–6)	CFSB Center (1,290); Murray, KY
Feb 1, 2021; 6:00 pm, ESPN+		at Southeast Missouri State	W 77–60	8–8 (5–6)	Show Me Center (690); Cape Girardeau, MO
Feb 4, 2021; 6:00 pm, ESPN+		at Morehead State	L 56–66	8–9 (5–7)	Ellis Johnson Arena (765); Morehead, KY
Feb 6, 2021; 3:00 pm, ESPN+		at Eastern Kentucky	W 76–64	9–9 (6–7)	McBrayer Arena (887); Richmond, KY
Feb 11, 2021; 7:30 pm, ESPN+		Southeast Missouri State	W 80–60	10–9 (7–7)	CFSB Center (1,252); Murray, KY
Feb 13, 2021; 7:30 pm, ESPN+		UT Martin	W 84–55	11–9 (8–7)	CFSB Center (1,257); Murray, KY
Feb 15, 2021; 4:00 pm, ESPN+		at SIU Edwardsville	W 86–57	12–9 (9–7)	First Community Arena (17); Edwardsville, IL
Feb 18, 2021; 7:30 pm, ESPN+		Eastern Illinois	L 59–68	12–10 (9–8)	CFSB Center (1,260); Murray, KY
Feb 20, 2021; 7:30 pm, ESPN+		SIU Edwardsville	W 89–62	13–10 (10–8)	CFSB Center (1,290); Murray, KY
Feb 25, 2021; 7:30 pm, ESPN+		at Jacksonville State	L 74–87	13–11 (10–9)	Pete Mathews Coliseum (725); Jacksonville, AL
Feb 27, 2021; 8:00 pm, ESPN+		at Tennessee Tech	L 61–71	13–12 (10–10)	Eblen Center (920); Cookeville, TN
Ohio Valley Conference tournament
March 4, 2021; 7:00 pm, ESPNU	(5)	vs. (4) Jacksonville State; Semifinals	L 65–68 ^{OT}	13–13	Ford Center (645); Evansville, IN
*Non-conference game. ^{#}Rankings from AP Poll. (#) Tournament seedings in parentheses. All times are in Central Time.
