= 2020–21 Tennessee State Tigers basketball team =

American college basketball season

2020–21 Tennessee State Tigers basketball
- Conference: Ohio Valley Conference
- Record: 4–19 (3–17 OVC)
- Head coach: Brian Collins (3rd season)
- Assistant coaches: Ben Walker; Jerry Nichols; Russ Willemsen
- Home arena: Gentry Complex

2020–21 Ohio Valley Conference men's basketball standings
| | Conf. | | | | Overall |
| Team | W | | L | PCT | W | | L | PCT |
|---|---|---|---|---|---|---|---|---|
| Belmont | 18 | – | 2 | .900 | 26 | – | 4 | .867 |
| Morehead State † | 17 | – | 3 | .850 | 23 | – | 8 | .742 |
| Eastern Kentucky | 15 | – | 5 | .750 | 22 | – | 7 | .759 |
| Jacksonville State | 13 | – | 6 | .684 | 18 | – | 9 | .667 |
| Austin Peay | 10 | – | 10 | .500 | 14 | – | 13 | .519 |
| Murray State | 10 | – | 10 | .500 | 13 | – | 13 | .500 |
| Southeast Missouri State | 9 | – | 11 | .450 | 11 | – | 16 | .407 |
| SIU Edwardsville | 7 | – | 12 | .368 | 9 | – | 17 | .346 |
| Eastern Illinois | 6 | – | 14 | .300 | 9 | – | 18 | .333 |
| UT Martin | 6 | – | 14 | .300 | 8 | – | 16 | .333 |
| Tennessee Tech | 5 | – | 15 | .250 | 5 | – | 22 | .185 |
| Tennessee State | 3 | – | 17 | .150 | 4 | – | 19 | .174 |
† 2021 OVC tournament winner

The 2020–21 Tennessee State Tigers basketball team represented Tennessee State University in the 2020–21 NCAA Division I men's basketball season. The Tigers, led by third-year head coach Brian Collins, played their home games at the Gentry Complex in Nashville, Tennessee as members of the Ohio Valley Conference.

== Previous season ==
The Tigers finished the 2019–20 season 18–15, 9–9 in OVC play to finish in a tie for fifth place. They defeated Morehead State in the first round of the OVC tournament, before losing in the quarterfinals to Eastern Kentucky. They accepted an invitation to participate in the 2020 CollegeInsider.com Postseason Tournament and were set to host a first-round game. However, the CIT was cancelled amid the COVID-19 pandemic.

== Roster ==
2020–21 Tennessee State Tigers men's basketball team
Players
Coaches

| Pos. | # | Name | Height | Weight | Year | Previous school | Hometown |
|---|---|---|---|---|---|---|---|
| G | 0 | Mark Freeman | 5 ft 10 in (1.78 m) | 160 lb (73 kg) | So | The Skill Factory | Memphis, Tennessee |
| G | 1 | Marcus Fitzgerald Jr. | 6 ft 2 in (1.88 m) | 175 lb (79 kg) | Fr | Pearl-Cohn High School | Nashville, Tennessee |
| G | 2 | Carlos Marshall Jr. | 6 ft 6 in (1.98 m) | 210 lb (95 kg) | RS Jr | SW Tennessee Community College | Memphis, Tennessee |
| G | 3 | Amorey Womack | 6 ft 1 in (1.85 m) | 185 lb (84 kg) | RS Fr | Webster Groves High School | St. Louis, Missouri |
| F | 4 | Shakem Johnson | 6 ft 7 in (2.01 m) | 210 lb (95 kg) | Sr | Navarro College | Youngstown, Ohio |
| G | 10 | Monty Johal | 6 ft 3 in (1.91 m) | 185 lb (84 kg) | RS So | Glendale High School | Springfield, Missouri |
| G | 11 | Shakwon Barrett | 6 ft 5 in (1.96 m) | 180 lb (82 kg) | Jr | Northwest Florida State College | Toronto, Ontario |
| F | 12 | Evan Joyner | 6 ft 8 in (2.03 m) | 180 lb (82 kg) | Fr | Piedmont Classical High School | Greensboro, North Carolina |
| F | 13 | Mason Green | 6 ft 10 in (2.08 m) | 220 lb (100 kg) | RS Jr | Mercer | Ellenwood, Georgia |
| F | 15 | Devonte Lanier | 6 ft 7 in (2.01 m) | 213 lb (97 kg) | Jr | Lawson State Community College | Huntsville, Alabama |
| G | 20 | Donnie Malone | 6 ft 2 in (1.88 m) | 185 lb (84 kg) | Sr | SW Tennessee Community College | Memphis, Tennessee |
| F | 22 | Josh Linder | 6 ft 8 in (2.03 m) | 210 lb (95 kg) | Sr | Georgia State | Kathleen, Georgia |
| G | 23 | Ravel Moody | 6 ft 6 in (1.98 m) | 200 lb (91 kg) | Sr | Northeastern Oklahoma | Denver, Colorado |
| F | 24 | Yusuf Mohamed | 6 ft 10 in (2.08 m) | 200 lb (91 kg) | Jr | North Idaho College | Seattle, Washington |
| G | 34 | Samone Nelson Jr. | 6 ft 5 in (1.96 m) | 200 lb (91 kg) | Sr | Central High School | Memphis, Tennessee |

Head coach

- Brian Collins (Belmont)

Assistant coach(es)

- Ben Walker (Creighton)
- Jerry Nichols (Arkansas State)
- Russ Willemsen (Lee)

Legend

- (C) Team captain
- (S) Suspended
- (I) Ineligible
- (W) Walk-on
- Injured
- Current redshirt

Roster
Last update: January 24, 2021

== Schedule and results ==
| Date time, TV | Rank^{#} | Opponent^{#} | Result | Record | Site (attendance) city, state |
Regular season
| November 26, 2020*; 11:00 am | | vs. Coppin State; Marshall Memorial MTE | Cancelled due to COVID-19 | | Cam Henderson Center; Huntington, WV |
| November 27, 2020*; 5:00 pm | | at Marshall; Marshall Memorial MTE | Cancelled due to COVID-19 | | Cam Henderson Center; Huntington, WV |
| December 8, 2020; 6:30 pm, ESPN+ | | at Belmont | L 64–79 | 0–1 (0–1) | Curb Event Center (250); Nashville, TN |
| December 12, 2020*; 11:00 am, ESPN3 | | at IUPUI | L 66–69 | 0–2 | Indiana Farmers Coliseum; Indianapolis, IN |
| December 18, 2020; 6:00 pm, ESPN+ | | Belmont | L 63–88 | 0–3 (0–2) | Gentry Complex (224); Nashville, TN |
| December 19, 2020*; 7:00 pm, ESPN+ | | Crowley's Ridge | W 90–68 | 1–3 | Gentry Complex; Nashville, TN |
| December 22, 2020*; 2:00 pm, ESPN+ | | Chattanooga | L 63–66 | 1–4 | Gentry Complex (147); Nashville, TN |
| December 30, 2020; 2:00 pm, ESPN+ | | Austin Peay | L 59–68 | 1–5 (0–3) | Gentry Complex (230); Nashville, TN |
| January 2, 2021; 5:00 pm, ESPN+ | | at Southeast Missouri State | L 79–83 ^{2OT} | 1–6 (0–4) | Show Me Center (760); Cape Girardeau, MO |
| January 7, 2021; 8:00 pm, ESPN+ | | UT Martin | W 74–62 | 2–6 (1–4) | Gentry Complex (338); Nashville, TN |
| January 14, 2021; 7:30 pm, ESPN+ | | at Jacksonville State | L 64–65 | 2–7 (1–5) | Pete Mathews Coliseum (635); Jacksonville, AL |
| January 16, 2021; 8:00 pm, ESPN+ | | at Tennessee Tech | L 71–74 | 2–8 (1–6) | Eblen Center; Cookeville, TN |
| January 19, 2021; 6:00 pm, ESPN+ | | Southeast Missouri State | L 59–63 | 2–9 (1–7) | Gentry Complex; Nashville, TN |
| January 21, 2021; 8:00 pm, ESPN+ | | SIU Edwardsville | L 65–67 | 2–10 (1–8) | Gentry Complex (279); Nashville, TN |
| January 23, 2021; 4:00 pm, ESPN+ | | Eastern Illinois | W 65–54 | 3–10 (2–8) | Gentry Complex (338); Nashville, TN |
| January 28, 2021; 7:30 pm, ESPN+ | | at Murray State | L 53–73 | 3–11 (2–9) | CFSB Center (1,290); Murray, KY |
| January 30, 2021; 4:00 pm, ESPN+ | | at Austin Peay | L 56–71 | 3–12 (2–10) | Dunn Center (703); Clarksville, TN |
| February 4, 2021; 1:00 pm, ESPN+ | | at SIU Edwardsville | L 60–68 | 3–13 (2–11) | First Community Arena; Edwardsville, IL |
| February 6, 2021; 4:00 pm, ESPN+ | | at Eastern Illinois | L 72–86 | 3–14 (2–12) | Lantz Arena (19); Charleston, IL |
| February 11, 2021; 8:00 pm, ESPN+ | | Morehead State | L 66–79 | 3–15 (2–13) | Gentry Complex (183); Nashville, TN |
| February 13, 2021; 4:00 pm, ESPN+ | | Eastern Kentucky | L 73–93 | 3–16 (2–14) | Gentry Complex (255); Nashville, TN |
| February 18, 2021; 8:00 pm, ESPN+ | | Tennessee Tech | W 91–86 | 4–16 (3–14) | Gentry Complex (202); Nashville, TN |
| February 20, 2021; 4:00 pm, ESPN+ | | Jacksonville State | L 76–77 | 4–17 (3–15) | Gentry Complex; Nashville, TN |
| February 25, 2021; 6:00 pm, ESPN+ | | at Morehead State | L 60–74 | 4–18 (3–16) | Ellis Johnson Arena (665); Morehead, KY |
| February 27, 2021; 6:00 pm, ESPN+ | | at Eastern Kentucky | L 84–89 | 4–19 (3–17) | McBrayer Arena; Richmond, KY |
*Non-conference game. ^{#}Rankings from AP Poll. (#) Tournament seedings in parentheses. All times are in Central.
