= 2020–21 UT Martin Skyhawks men's basketball team =

American college basketball season

2020–21 UT Martin Skyhawks men's basketball
- Conference: Ohio Valley Conference
- West Division
- Record: 8–16 (6–14 OVC)
- Head coach: Montez Robinson (Interim) (1st season)
- Assistant coaches: Jackson Hayzlett (1st season); DeAndre Walker (7th season); Zach Carpenter (4th season)
- Home arena: Skyhawk Arena

2020–21 Ohio Valley Conference men's basketball standings
| | Conf. | | | | Overall |
| Team | W | | L | PCT | W | | L | PCT |
|---|---|---|---|---|---|---|---|---|
| Belmont | 18 | – | 2 | .900 | 26 | – | 4 | .867 |
| Morehead State † | 17 | – | 3 | .850 | 23 | – | 8 | .742 |
| Eastern Kentucky | 15 | – | 5 | .750 | 22 | – | 7 | .759 |
| Jacksonville State | 13 | – | 6 | .684 | 18 | – | 9 | .667 |
| Austin Peay | 10 | – | 10 | .500 | 14 | – | 13 | .519 |
| Murray State | 10 | – | 10 | .500 | 13 | – | 13 | .500 |
| Southeast Missouri State | 9 | – | 11 | .450 | 11 | – | 16 | .407 |
| SIU Edwardsville | 7 | – | 12 | .368 | 9 | – | 17 | .346 |
| Eastern Illinois | 6 | – | 14 | .300 | 9 | – | 18 | .333 |
| UT Martin | 6 | – | 14 | .300 | 8 | – | 16 | .333 |
| Tennessee Tech | 5 | – | 15 | .250 | 5 | – | 22 | .185 |
| Tennessee State | 3 | – | 17 | .150 | 4 | – | 19 | .174 |
† 2021 OVC tournament winner

The 2020–21 UT Martin Skyhawks men's basketball team represented the University of Tennessee at Martin during the 2020–21 NCAA Division I men's basketball season. The Skyhawks, led by interim head coach Montez Robinson, played their home games at Skyhawk Arena in Martin, Tennessee as members of the Ohio Valley Conference.

On November 15, 10 days before the scheduled start of the season, the school announced that head coach Anthony Stewart, who was entering his fifth year as head coach, had died suddenly. No cause of death was given. On November 17, the school announced that assistant coach Montez Robinson, who had been named an assistant in September, had been named interim head coach for the season.

== Previous season ==
The Skyhawks finished the 2019–20 season 9–20, 5–13 in OVC play to finish in a tie for 10th place. They failed to qualify for the OVC tournament.

== Roster ==
2020–21 UT Martin Skyhawks men's basketball team
Players
Coaches

| Pos. | # | Name | Height | Weight | Year | Previous school | Hometown |
|---|---|---|---|---|---|---|---|
| G | 00 | Eden Holt | 5 ft 10 in (1.78 m) | 175 lb (79 kg) | So | Williston State College | Houston, Texas |
| G | 2 | Anthony Thomas | 6 ft 7 in (2.01 m) | 175 lb (79 kg) | Fr | Olympus Preparatory Academy | Silver Spring, Maryland |
| G | 3 | Eman Sertovic | 6 ft 5 in (1.96 m) | 195 lb (88 kg) | So | Bella Vista Prep | Bihać, Bosnia and Herzegovina |
| F | 4 | Jaron Williams | 6 ft 6 in (1.98 m) | 210 lb (95 kg) | Jr | College of Central Florida | Rock Hill, South Carolina |
| G | 5 | Jonte Coleman | 6 ft 4 in (1.93 m) | 195 lb (88 kg) | Jr | Kankakee CC | Champaign, Illinois |
| C | 10 | Eric Rustin | 7 ft 0 in (2.13 m) | 185 lb (84 kg) | Fr | Tennessee Prep Academy | Richmond, Virginia |
| F | 11 | Jeremiah Harris | 6 ft 4 in (1.93 m) | 205 lb (93 kg) | Jr | Gadsden State CC | Bessemer, Ala. |
| F | 12 | Ajani Kennedy | 6 ft 9 in (2.06 m) | 215 lb (98 kg) | Jr | UC Riverside | Moreno Valley, California |
| F | 13 | Zavon Godwin | 6 ft 6 in (1.98 m) | 215 lb (98 kg) | Jr | Schoolcraft College | Detroit, Michigan |
| F | 15 | Cameron Holden | 6 ft 5 in (1.96 m) | 200 lb (91 kg) | Jr | Gulf Coast State College | Forsyth, Georgia |
| F | 21 | Dante Gonzales | 6 ft 4 in (1.93 m) | 170 lb (77 kg) | RS So | Mesa CC | Gilbert, Arizona |
| F | 22 | La-Quiem Walker | 6 ft 9 in (2.06 m) | 240 lb (109 kg) | Sr | Kaskaskia College | Jersey City, New Jersey |
| G | 23 | Vinnie Viana | 6 ft 1 in (1.85 m) | 170 lb (77 kg) | Jr | Albany Technical College | Atlanta, Georgia |
| G | 24 | Trey Fort | 6 ft 4 in (1.93 m) | 195 lb (88 kg) | Fr | DME Sports Academy | Jackson, Mississippi |
| G | 33 | Kenton Eskridge | 6 ft 1 in (1.85 m) | 195 lb (88 kg) | Jr | Ranger College | Atlanta, Georgia |
| C | 44 | Hannes Pöllä | 6 ft 11 in (2.11 m) | 270 lb (122 kg) | Jr | Oklahoma | Lahti, Finland |

Head coach

- Montez Robinson (interim) (Alcorn State)

Assistant coach(es)

- DeAndre Walker (Fairmont State)
- Zack Carpenter (Lee)
- Jackson Hayzlett (North Carolina State)

Legend

- (C) Team captain
- (S) Suspended
- (I) Ineligible
- (W) Walk-on
- Injured
- Current redshirt

Roster
Last update: January 2, 2021

== Schedule and results ==
| Date time, TV | Rank^{#} | Opponent^{#} | Result | Record | Site (attendance) city, state |
Regular season
| December 2, 2020*; 7:00 pm, ESPN+ | | Evansville | W 93–87 ^{2OT} | 1–0 | Skyhawk Arena (211); Martin, TN |
| December 5, 2020*; 8:00 pm, BTN | | at No. 5 Illinois | Canceled due to COVID-19 issues | | State Farm Center; Champaign, IL |
| December 9, 2020*; 6:00 pm, SECN | | at No. 12 Tennessee | Canceled due to COVID-19 issues | | Thompson-Boling Arena; Knoxville, TN |
| December 15, 2020*; 2:00 pm, ESPN+ | | Bethel | W 95–60 | 2–0 | Skyhawk Arena (125); Martin, TN |
| December 18, 2020; 5:00 pm, ESPN+ | | at Southeast Missouri State | W 81–63 | 3–0 (1–0) | Show Me Center (748); Cape Girardeau, MO |
| December 20, 2020*; 5:00 pm, ESPN+ | | Western Illinois | L 63–81 | 3–1 | Skyhawk Arena; Martin, TN |
| December 22, 2020*; 4:00 pm, SECN+ | | at Ole Miss | L 43–90 | 3–2 | The Pavilion at Ole Miss (875); Oxford, MS |
| December 30, 2020; 7:30 pm, ESPN+ | | at Jacksonville State | L 70–80 | 3–3 (1–1) | Pete Mathews Coliseum (588); Jacksonville, AL |
| January 2, 2021; 4:00 pm, ESPN+ | | Belmont | L 69–90 | 3–4 (1–2) | Skyhawk Arena (165); Martin, TN |
| January 7, 2021; 8:00 pm, ESPN+ | | at Tennessee State | L 62–74 | 3–5 (1–3) | Gentry Center (338); Nashville, TN |
| January 7, 2021; 8:00 pm, ESPN+ | | at Belmont | L 62–74 | 3–6 (1–4) | Curb Event Center (338); Nashville, TN |
| January 16, 2021; 4:00 pm, ESPN+ | | Murray State | L 57–79 | 3–7 (1–5) | Skyhawk Arena (231); Martin, TN |
| January 21, 2021; 7:00 pm, ESPN+ | | at Eastern Kentucky | L 73–113 | 3–8 (1–6) | McBrayer Arena (759); Richmond, KY |
| January 23, 2021; 3:00 pm, ESPN+ | | at Morehead State | L 44–76 | 3–9 (1–7) | Ellis Johnson Arena (500); Morehead, KY |
| January 26, 2021; 8:00 pm, ESPN+ | | Southeast Missouri State | W 69–66 | 4–9 (2–7) | Skyhawk Arena (267); Martin, TN |
| January 28, 2021; 8:00 pm, ESPN+ | | Eastern Illinois | W 51–41 | 5–9 (3–7) | Skyhawk Arena (360); Martin, TN |
| January 30, 2021; 4:00 pm, ESPN+ | | SIUE Edwardsville | L 60–76 | 5–10 (3–8) | Skyhawk Arena (234); Martin, TN |
| February 4, 2021; 8:00 pm, ESPN+ | | Jacksonville State | L 70–82 | 5–11 (3–9) | Skyhawk Arena (240); Martin, TN |
| February 6, 2021; 4:00 pm, ESPN+ | | Tennessee Tech | W 66–64 | 6–11 (4–9) | Skyhawk Arena (198); Martin, TN |
| February 8, 2021; 8:00 pm, ESPN+ | | Austin Peay | W 76–75 | 7–11 (5–9) | Skyhawk Arena (319); Martin, TN |
| February 11, 2021; 7:30 pm, ESPN+ | | at Austin Peay | L 50–71 | 7–12 (5–10) | Winfield Dunn Center (423); Clarksville, TN |
| February 13, 2021; 7:30 pm, ESPN+ | | at Murray State | L 55–84 | 7–13 (5–11) | CFSB Center (1,257); Murray, KY |
| February 18, 2021; 8:00 pm, ESPN+ | | Eastern Kentucky | L 72–89 | 7–14 (5–12) | Skyhawk Arena (173); Martin, TN |
| February 20, 2021; 4:00 pm, ESPN+ | | Morehead State | L 69–79 | 7–15 (5–13) | Skyhawk Arena (166); Martin, TN |
| February 25, 2021; 5:00 pm, ESPN+ | | at SIU Edwardsville | L 53–66 | 7–16 (5–14) | First Community Arena (50); Edwardsville, IL |
| February 27, 2021; 4:00 pm, ESPN+ | | at Eastern Illinois | W 73–68 | 8–16 (6–14) | Lantz Arena (50); Charleston, IL |
*Non-conference game. ^{#}Rankings from AP Poll. (#) Tournament seedings in parentheses. All times are in Central.
