= 2020–21 SIU Edwardsville Cougars men's basketball team =

American college basketball season

2020–21 SIU Edwardsville Cougars men's basketball
- Conference: Ohio Valley Conference
- Record: 9–17 (7–12 OVC)
- Head coach: Brian Barone (2nd season)
- Assistant coach: Charles "Bubba" Wells; Mike Waldo; Troy Pierce; Colin Schneider (director of basketball operations); Detae McMurray (graduate assistant for player development)
- Home arena: First Community Arena at Vadalabene Center

2020–21 Ohio Valley Conference men's basketball standings
	Conf.				Overall
Team	W		L	PCT	W		L	PCT
Belmont	18	–	2	.900	26	–	4	.867
Morehead State †	17	–	3	.850	23	–	8	.742
Eastern Kentucky	15	–	5	.750	22	–	7	.759
Jacksonville State	13	–	6	.684	18	–	9	.667
Austin Peay	10	–	10	.500	14	–	13	.519
Murray State	10	–	10	.500	13	–	13	.500
Southeast Missouri State	9	–	11	.450	11	–	16	.407
SIU Edwardsville	7	–	12	.368	9	–	17	.346
Eastern Illinois	6	–	14	.300	9	–	18	.333
UT Martin	6	–	14	.300	8	–	16	.333
Tennessee Tech	5	–	15	.250	5	–	22	.185
Tennessee State	3	–	17	.150	4	–	19	.174
† 2021 OVC tournament winner

The 2020–21 SIU Edwardsville Cougars men's basketball team represented Southern Illinois University Edwardsville during the 2020–21 NCAA Division I men's basketball season. The Cougars, led by second-year head coach Brian Barone, played their home games in the First Community Arena at Vadalabene Center in Edwardsville, Illinois as members of the Ohio Valley Conference.

== Previous season ==
The Cougars finished the 2019–20 season 8–23, 5–13 in OVC play to finish in a tie for tenth place. The Cougars failed to qualify for the OVC Tournament.

== Preseason ==
Five players who saw major playing time and a third-year former walk-on return from the 8–23 team of 2019–20. They are joined by one junior who saw considerable action in the 2018-19 season but sat out last season as a medical "redshirt", three freshmen, three junior college transfers, and one transfer from another Division I program. Coach Barone, his assistants, and the Cougars recruited probably the strongest incoming group in the program's history. The recruits included SIUE's first legitimate "blue chip" recruit, Ray'Sean Taylor from nearby Collinsville, who suffered an ACL injury that ended his first Cougars season before it began. A second :"blue chipper" came on board with Sidney Wilson's late transfer from Connecticut. Three scholarship players with eligibility remaining did not return; two transferred to other Division I programs, and Zeke Moore is playing professionally in Spain.

In a vote of conference coaches and sports information directors, SIUE was picked to finish in 11th place in the OVC.

== Regular season ==
After leading the team with career-highs of 18 points, 7 rebounds, and 5 assists in the Cougars' win at Morehead State, Sidney Wilson was named the OVC Newcomer of the Week on December 21.

The ongoing COVID-19 pandemic necessitated revision after revision to the Cougars' schedule. The game at Northwestern was cancelled, and nine (9) OVC games were postponed, including a postponement of a rescheduled game.

After averaging 18.0 points, 4.3 rebounds, 2.3 assists and 1.3 blocks/game while hitting 50 percent (20-of-40) from the field and 73.3 percent (11-of-15) from the free throw line in three road games, Sydney Wilson was again named the OVC Newcomer of the Week on February 1.

The Cougars went 33 days without a game in the span between December 18 and January 21, To make up for the nine game postponements, SIUE was scheduled to play four games per week. Then the OVC ruled that no more than three games were to be played per week; this change brought about a tenth postponement and the cancelation of a game versus Jacksonville State.

COVID-19, injuries, and the wear and tear of too many games in too few days to make up for all of the postponements resulted in less success than hoped for. However, the Cougars qualified for th Ohio Valley Conference Tournament, after missing it last season. This was helped by the Cougars' six road wins, the most in the Division I era.

== Postseason ==
The Cougars, the 8th seed in the OVC Tournament, Lost to the top-seeded Belmont Bruins for a third time, but by a much closer margin.

== Roster ==
Source =

2020–21 SIU Edwardsville Cougars men's basketball team
Players
Coaches

Pos.	#	Name	Height	Weight	Year	Previous school	Hometown
F	0	Sidney Wilson	6 ft 7 in (2.01 m)	180 lb (82 kg)	So	UConn/Brewster Academy	The Bronx, NY
G	1	Mike Adewunmi	6 ft 5 in (1.96 m)	205 lb (93 kg)	Sr	McLennan CC/Lake Ridge HS	Dallas, TX
G	2	Desmond Polk	6 ft 4 in (1.93 m)	175 lb (79 kg)	Fr	Link Year Prep/New Berlin West	Milwaukee, WI
G	3	Ray'Sean Taylor (injured)	6 ft 1 in (1.85 m)	175 lb (79 kg)	Fr	Collinsville HS	Collinsville, IL.
G	5	Carlos Curtis # (injured)	6 ft 2 in (1.88 m)	205 lb (93 kg)	Jr	Triton College/Riverside University HS	Milwaukee, WI
G	11	Courtney Carter	6 ft 1 in (1.85 m)	180 lb (82 kg)	Jr	South Suburban College/East HS	Memphis, TN
F/C	15	Philip Pepple, Jr	6 ft 10 in (2.08 m)	230 lb (104 kg)	Jr	Casper College/Shorecrest HS	Shoreline, WA
G	21	Zane Butler †	5 ft 11 in (1.8 m)	165 lb (75 kg)	Fr	Link Year Prep/Greene County Tech	Paragould, AR
F	22	Michael Matas	6 ft 8 in (2.03 m)	200 lb (91 kg)	Fr	London Basketball Academy	Oakville, ONT, Canada
C	23	Elochukwu Eze	6 ft 10 in (2.08 m)	240 lb (109 kg)	So	Asheville Christian Academy	Enugu, Nigeria
F	24	Cameron Williams # (injured)	6 ft 2 in (1.88 m)	190 lb (86 kg)	Jr	Hazelwood Central HS	St. Louis, MO
G	31	Jackson Best (xW)	5 ft 9 in (1.75 m)	165 lb (75 kg)	Sr	Edwardsville HS	Edwardsville, IL
F	42	Shamar Wright	6 ft 7 in (2.01 m)	185 lb (84 kg)	So	Link Year Prep/Murrieta Mesa HS	Murrieta, CA
G	52	Iziah James	6 ft 0 in (1.83 m)	180 lb (82 kg)	Sr	Indian Hills CC/Cape Henry Collegiate School	Chesapeake, VA
F	55	Lamar Wright	6 ft 7 in (2.01 m)	185 lb (84 kg)	So	Link Year Prep/Murrieta Mesa HS	Murrieta, CA

Head coach

- Brian Barone (Marquette)

Assistant coach(es)

- Bubba Wells (Austin Peay)
- Mike Waldo (SIUE)
- Troy Pierce (Emporia State)

Legend

- (C) Team captain
- (S) Suspended
- (I) Ineligible
- (W) Walk-on
- Injured
- Current redshirt

Roster
Last update: 21 October 2020

- † = Joined the team at the semester break.
- # = Mid-season injury.

== Schedule and results ==
Date time, TV	Opponent	Result	Record	High points	High rebounds	High assists	Site (attendance) city, state
Non-conference regular season
November 25, 2020*; 6:00 pm, ESPN+	at Saint Louis; Billiken Classic	L 52–89	0–1	14 – Wilson	7 – Wilson	3 – Williams	Chaifetz Arena (0); St. Louis, MO
November 26, 2020*; 6:00 pm, ESPN+	vs. LSU; Billiken Classic	L 81–94	0–2	23 – Adewunmi	10 – Pepple	5 – Carter	Chaifetz Arena (0); St. Louis, MO
November 28, 2020*; 7:30 pm, ESPN+	vs. St. Louis Pharmacy; Billiken Classic	W 80–45	1–2	15 – Wilson	7 – Adewunmi, James & Pepple	7 – Carter	Chaifetz Arena (0); St. Louis, MO
December 2, 2020*; 6:00 pm, ESPN+	at Northern Illinois	W 73–53	2–2	22 – Wilson	12 – Adewunmi	7 – Carter	Convocation Center (0); DeKalb, IL
December 5, 2020*; 2:00 pm, ESPN+	Omaha	L 65–67	2–3	13 – Adewunmi	10 – Adewunmi	3 – Carter	First Community Arena (0); Edwardsville, IL
December 9, 2020*; 6:00 pm, ESPN3	at Valparaiso	L 58–80	2–4	16 – Wilson	7 – Team	4 – S. Wright	The ARC (60); Valparaiso, IN
December 13, 2020*; 3:00 pm, ESPNU	at Northwestern	Canceled					Welsh–Ryan Arena; Evanston, IL
Ohio Valley Conference regular season
December 18, 2020; 5:00 pm, ESPN+	at Morehead State	W 69–65	3–4 (1–0)	18 – Wilson	9 – Wilson	5 – Wilson	Ellis Johnson Arena (375); Morehead, KY
January 21, 2021; 8:00 pm, ESPN+	at Tennessee State	W 67–65	4–4 (2–0)	18 – Adewunmi	9 – S.Wright	3 – Curtis & James	Gentry Complex (202); Nashville, TN
January 23, 2021; 4:00 pm, ESPN+	at Belmont	L 62–114	4–5 (2–1)	12 – James	5 – Curtis & S.Wright	3 – Carter	Curb Event Center (—); Nashville, TN
January 26, 2021; 7:00 pm, ESPN+	at Eastern Illinois; Postponed from 1/5/21	W 87–74	5–5 (3–1)	18 – Curtis	12 – Adewunmi	4 – Curtis	Lantz Arena (—); Charleston, IL
January 28, 2021; 8:00 pm, ESPN+	at Southeast Missouri State	L 62–64	5–6 (3–2)	23 – Wilson	8 – Adewunmi & Curtis	6 – Carter	Show Me Center (723); Cape Girardeau, MO
January 30, 2021; 4:00 pm, ESPN+	at UT Martin	W 76–60	6–6 (4–2)	20 – Adewunmi	9 – S. Wright	5 – Carter & James	Skyhawk Arena (234); Martin, TN
February 1, 2021; 2:00 pm, ESPN+	Austin Peay; Postponed from 1/7/21	L 59–76	6–7 (4–3)	16 – Adewunmi	9 – Adewunmi	3 – Carter	First Community Arena (0); Edwardsville, IL
February 2, 2021; 4:00 pm, ESPN+	Eastern Illinois; Postponed from 12/21/20 & 1/12/21	L 61–70	6–8 (4–4)	13 – S. Wright	7 – Curtis	5 – James	First Community Arena (0); Edwardsville, IL
February 4, 2021; 1:00 pm, ESPN+	Tennessee State	W 68–60	7–8 (5–4)	16 – Curtis	11 – S. Wright	5 – Curtis	First Community Arena (0); Edwardsville, IL
February 6, 2021; 12:30 pm, ESPN+	Belmont	L 62–94	7–9 (5–5)	20 – Curtis	7 – Curtis	5 – Carter	First Community Arena (59); Edwardsville, IL
February 8, 2021; 2:00 pm, ESPN+	Eastern Kentucky; Postponed from 1/14/21	L 74–78	7–10 (5–6)	23 – Adewunmi	7 – S. Wright	9 – Curtis	First Community Arena (50); Edwardsville, IL
February 11, 2021; 8:00 pm, ESPN+	at Tennessee Tech	W 81–63	8–10 (6–6)	18 – Carter	7 – Curtis	9 – Curtis	Eblen Center (534); Cookeville, TN
February 13, 2021; 4:00 pm, ESPN+	at Jacksonville State	L 60–80	8–11 (6–7)	17 – Wilson	8 – Adewunmi	4 – Carter	Pete Mathews Coliseum (513); Jacksonville, AL
February 15, 2021; 4:00 pm, ESPN+h	Murray State; Postponed from 1/9/21 & 2/9/21	L 57–86	8–12 (6–8)	17 – Adewunmi	7 – Adewunmi	4 – Carter	First Community Arena (17); Edwardsville, IL
February 15, 2021; 6:00 pm, ESPN+	at Jacksonville State †; Postponed from 1/2/21;	Canceled					Pete Mathews Coliseum; Jacksonville, AL
February 18, 2021; 7:30 pm, ESPN+	at Austin Peay	L 57–79	8–13 (6–9)	17 – Adewunmi	5 – Butler	4 – Carter	Dunn Center (108); Clarksville, TN
February 20, 2021; 7:30 pm, ESPN+	at Murray State	L 62–89	8–14 (6–10)	10 – Carter, James & S. Wright	5 – Adewunmi & S. Wright	2 – Carter & James	CFSB Center (1,290); Murray, KY
February 22, 2021; 5:00 pm, ESPN+	Morehead State; Postponed from 1/16/21	L 48–56	8–15 (6–11)	12 – S. Wright	8 – James	3 – Carter & James	First Community Arena (50); Edwardsville, IL
February 25, 2021; 5:00 pm, ESPN+	UT Martin	W 66–53	9–15 (7–11)	17 – S. Wright	10 – L. Wright	6 – S. Wright	First Community Arena (50); Edwardsville, IL
February 27, 2021; 5:00 pm, ESPN+	Southeast Missouri State	L 63–69	9–16 (7–12)	16 – Carter	6 – Carter, Matas, Team	5 – Carter	First Community Arena (50); Edwardsville, IL
Ohio Valley Conference Tournament
March 3, 2021; 7:00 pm, ESPN+	vs. (1) Belmont; Quarterfinals	L 61–78	9–17	18 – James	6 – Adewunmi	4 – Carter	Ford Center (266); Evansville, IN
*Non-conference game. ^{#}Rankings from AP Poll. (#) Tournament seedings in parentheses. All times are in Central Time; Source.

† = Due to the many schedule changes, it was necessary to move SIUE's home game with Jacksonville State to Jacksonville, AL, but the game was later cancelled, when the OVC limited teams to three games per week.
