= 2020–21 Southeast Missouri State Redhawks men's basketball team =

American college basketball season

2020–21 Southeast Missouri State Redhawks men's basketball
- Conference: Ohio Valley Conference
- Record: 11–16 (9–11 OVC)
- Head coach: Brad Korn (1st season)
- Assistant coaches: Keith Pickens; Dustin Yoder; Sam McMahon
- Home arena: Show Me Center

2020–21 Ohio Valley Conference men's basketball standings
	Conf.				Overall
Team	W		L	PCT	W		L	PCT
Belmont	18	–	2	.900	26	–	4	.867
Morehead State †	17	–	3	.850	23	–	8	.742
Eastern Kentucky	15	–	5	.750	22	–	7	.759
Jacksonville State	13	–	6	.684	18	–	9	.667
Austin Peay	10	–	10	.500	14	–	13	.519
Murray State	10	–	10	.500	13	–	13	.500
Southeast Missouri State	9	–	11	.450	11	–	16	.407
SIU Edwardsville	7	–	12	.368	9	–	17	.346
Eastern Illinois	6	–	14	.300	9	–	18	.333
UT Martin	6	–	14	.300	8	–	16	.333
Tennessee Tech	5	–	15	.250	5	–	22	.185
Tennessee State	3	–	17	.150	4	–	19	.174
† 2021 OVC tournament winner

The 2020–21 Southeast Missouri State Redhawks men's basketball team represented Southeast Missouri State University in the 2020–21 NCAA Division I men's basketball season. The Redhawks, led by first-year head coach Brad Korn, played their home games at the Show Me Center in Cape Girardeau, Missouri as members of the Ohio Valley Conference.

== Previous season ==
The Redhawks finished the 2019–20 season 7–24, 3–15 in OVC play, to finish in last place. They failed to qualify for the OVC tournament.

On March 3, head coach Rick Ray was fired. He finished at Southeast Missouri State with a five-year record of 51–104. On March 23, the school named former Kansas State assistant coach Brad Korn the new head coach.

== Roster ==
2020–21 Southeast Missouri State Redhawks men's basketball team
Players
Coaches

Pos.	#	Name	Height	Weight	Year	Previous school	Hometown
G	2	Jordan Love	6 ft 5 in (1.96 m)	180 lb (82 kg)	RS So	Voyager Academy	Durham, NC
G	3	Eric Jr. Reed	6 ft 2 in (1.88 m)	190 lb (86 kg)	Jr	Howard College	Baton Rouge, LA
G	5	Chris Harris	6 ft 3 in (1.91 m)	205 lb (93 kg)	RS Jr	John A. Logan College	Antioch, IL
F	10	Manny Patterson	6 ft 8 in (2.03 m)	220 lb (100 kg)	Sr	Green Bay	Chicago, IL
G	11	DQ Nicholas	6 ft 1 in (1.85 m)	180 lb (82 kg)	So	Scotland Prep School	Atlanta, GA
F	12	Evan Morrison	6 ft 6 in (1.98 m)	200 lb (91 kg)	Sr	Johnson County Community College	Lee's Summit, MO
G	13	Parker Long	6 ft 2 in (1.88 m)	175 lb (79 kg)	So	Maryville	Sikeston, MO
C	14	Nate Johnson	6 ft 9 in (2.06 m)	250 lb (113 kg)	Jr	Seminole State College	Broward County, FL
G	21	Nana Akenten	6 ft 6 in (1.98 m)	215 lb (98 kg)	RS Jr	Nebraska	Bolingbrook, IL
G	25	Nygal Russell	6 ft 4 in (1.93 m)	205 lb (93 kg)	Jr	ASPIRE Academy (KY)	Houston, TX
F	31	Nolan Taylor	6 ft 7 in (2.01 m)	260 lb (118 kg)	RS Sr	Cal Poly	Keller, TX
F	33	Dylan Branson	6 ft 5 in (1.96 m)	220 lb (100 kg)	Fr	Mehlville High School	St. Louis, MO
F	44	Darrious Agnew	6 ft 8 in (2.03 m)	220 lb (100 kg)	Sr	East Mississippi Community College	Starkville, MS
G		Allen Jr. Hatchett	6 ft 4 in (1.93 m)	200 lb (91 kg)	Jr	Bossier Parish Community College	Memphis, TN

Head coach

- Brad Korn (Southern Illinois)

Assistant coach(es)

- Keith Pickens (Missouri State)
- Dustin Yoder (Illinois)
- Sam McMahon (Delaware)

Legend

- (C) Team captain
- (S) Suspended
- (I) Ineligible
- (W) Walk-on
- Injured
- Current redshirt

Roster
Last update: January 26, 2021

== Schedule and results ==
Date time, TV	Rank^{#}	Opponent^{#}	Result	Record	Site (attendance) city, state
Regular season
November 27, 2020*; 7:00 p.m.		vs. Northern Colorado; Negro Leagues Baseball Museum TipOff Classic Semifinal	Canceled (CDC/NCAA guidelines)		Mabee Fieldhouse; Kansas City, MO
November 28, 2020*; 4:00 p.m.		vs. Kansas City; Negro Leagues Baseball Museum TipOff Classic Final	W 71–66	1–0	Mabee Fieldhouse (175); Kansas City, MO
December 2, 2020*; 6:30 p.m., ESPN+		Southern Illinois	L 79–87 ^{OT}	1–1	Show Me Center (740); Cape Girardeau, MO
December 7, 2020*; 6:30 p.m., ESPN+		Lipscomb	W 82–77	2–1	Show Me Center (580); Cape Girardeau, MO
December 9, 2020*; 7:00 p.m., ESPN+		at Lipscomb	L 74–80 ^{OT}	2–2	Allen Arena (488); Nashville, TN
December 15, 2020*; 6:00 p.m., ESPN+		at Evansville	L 63–66 ^{OT}	2–3	Ford Center; Evansville, IN
December 18, 2020; 6:30 p.m., ESPN+		UT Martin	L 67–69	2–4 (0–1)	Show Me Center (748); Cape Girardeau, MO
December 22, 2020*; 12:00 p.m., ESPN3		at Indiana State	L 66–72	2–5	Hulman Center (100); Terre Haute, IN
December 30, 2020; 8:00 p.m., ESPN+		at Tennessee Tech	L 63–72	2–6 (0–2)	Eblen Center (430); Cookeville, TN
January 2, 2021; 5:00 p.m., ESPN+		Tennessee State	W 83–79 ^{2OT}	3–6 (1–2)	Show Me Center (760); Cape Girardeau, MO
January 7, 2021; 6:00 p.m., ESPN+		at Belmont	L 66–77	3–7 (1–3)	Curb Event Center (271); Nashville, TN
January 16, 2021; 4:00 p.m., ESPN+		Morehead State	L 50–64	3–8 (1–4)	Show Me Center (799); Cape Girardeau, MO
January 19, 2021; 6:00 p.m., ESPN+		at Tennessee State	W 63–59	4–8 (2–4)	Gentry Complex (231); Nashville, TN
January 21, 2021; 6:00 p.m., ESPNU		at Morehead State	L 65–76	4–9 (2–5)	Ellis Johnson Arena (775); Morehead, KY
January 26, 2021; 8:00 p.m., ESPN+		at UT Martin	L 66–69	4–10 (2–6)	Skyhawk Arena (267); Martin, TN
January 28, 2021; 8:00 p.m., ESPN+		SIU Edwardsville	W 64–62	5–10 (3–6)	Show Me Center (723); Cape Girardeau, MO
January 30, 2021; 5:00 p.m., ESPN+		Eastern Illinois	W 75–44	6–10 (4–6)	Show Me Center (842); Cape Girardeau, MO
February 1, 2021; 6:00 p.m., ESPN+		Murray State	L 60–77	6–11 (4–7)	Show Me Center (690); Cape Girardeau, MO
February 4, 2021; 8:00 p.m., ESPN+		Tennessee Tech	W 68–64	7–11 (5–7)	Show Me Center (642); Cape Girardeau, MO
February 6, 2021; 4:00 p.m., ESPN+		Jacksonville State	L 54–66	7–12 (5–8)	Show Me Center (720); Cape Girardeau, MO
February 12, 2021; 5:00 p.m., ESPN+		at Murray State	L 60–80	7–13 (5–9)	CFSB Center (1,252); Murray, KY
February 13, 2021; 4:00 p.m., ESPN+		at Austin Peay	L 63–78	7–14 (5–10)	Dunn Center (494); Clarksville, TN
February 16, 2021; 6:00 p.m., ESPN+		Austin Peay	W 86–81 ^{OT}	8–14 (6–10)	Show Me Center (279); Cape Girardeau, MO
February 20, 2021; 5:00 p.m., ESPN+		Eastern Kentucky	W 94–72	9–14 (7–10)	Show Me Center (753); Cape Girardeau, MO
February 22, 2021; 6:00 p.m., ESPN+		Eastern Kentucky	L 65–87	9–15 (7–11)	Show Me Center (289); Cape Girardeau, MO
February 25, 2021; 7:30 p.m., ESPN+		at Eastern Illinois	W 94–88	10–15 (8–11)	Lantz Arena (29); Charleston, IL
February 27, 2021; 5:00 p.m., ESPN+		at SIU Edwardsville	W 69–63	11–15 (9–11)	First Community Arena (50); Edwardsville, IL
OVC tournament
March 4, 2021; 9:30 p.m., ESPN+	(7)	vs. (2) Morehead State; First round	L 54–61	11–16	Ford Center (266); Evansville, IN
*Non-conference game. ^{#}Rankings from AP poll. (#) Tournament seedings in parentheses. All times are in Central.
