= 2020–21 Jacksonville State Gamecocks men's basketball team =

American college basketball season

2020–2021 Jacksonville State Gamecocks men's basketball
- Conference: Ohio Valley Conference
- Record: 18–9 (13–6 OVC)
- Head coach: Ray Harper (5th season)
- Assistant coaches: Tommy Wade; Jake Morton; Tysor Anderson
- Home arena: Pete Mathews Coliseum

2020–21 Ohio Valley Conference men's basketball standings
	Conf.				Overall
Team	W		L	PCT	W		L	PCT
Belmont	18	–	2	.900	26	–	4	.867
Morehead State †	17	–	3	.850	23	–	8	.742
Eastern Kentucky	15	–	5	.750	22	–	7	.759
Jacksonville State	13	–	6	.684	18	–	9	.667
Austin Peay	10	–	10	.500	14	–	13	.519
Murray State	10	–	10	.500	13	–	13	.500
Southeast Missouri State	9	–	11	.450	11	–	16	.407
SIU Edwardsville	7	–	12	.368	9	–	17	.346
Eastern Illinois	6	–	14	.300	9	–	18	.333
UT Martin	6	–	14	.300	8	–	16	.333
Tennessee Tech	5	–	15	.250	5	–	22	.185
Tennessee State	3	–	17	.150	4	–	19	.174
† 2021 OVC tournament winner

The 2020–21 Jacksonville State Gamecocks men's basketball team represented Jacksonville State University (JSU) in the 2020–21 NCAA Division I men's basketball season. The Gamecocks, led by fifth-year head coach Ray Harper, played home games at the Pete Mathews Coliseum in Jacksonville, Alabama in their 18th and final season as members of the Ohio Valley Conference (OVC). JSU returned to the ASUN Conference, which it had left in 2003 to join the OVC, on July 1, 2021.

== Previous season ==
The Gamecocks finished the 2019–20 season 13–19, 8–10 in OVC play, to finish in seventh place. They lost in the first round of the OVC tournament to Eastern Illinois.

== Roster ==
2020–21 Jacksonville State Gamecocks men's basketball team
Players
Coaches

Pos.	#	Name	Height	Weight	Year	Previous school	Hometown
G	0	Jalen Finch	6 ft 1 in (1.85 m)	165 lb (75 kg)	Jr	Florida SouthWestern State	Raleigh, NC
G	1	Demaree King	6 ft 0 in (1.83 m)	180 lb (82 kg)	Jr	Northern Oklahoma College	Tulsa, OK
G	2	Semaj Henderson	6 ft 2 in (1.88 m)	180 lb (82 kg)	Fr	Downers Grove North HS	Chicago, IL
C	3	Maros Zeliznak	6 ft 11 in (2.11 m)	265 lb (120 kg)	Jr	Get Better Academy	Košice, Slovakia
F	4	Marcellus Brigham Jr.	6 ft 7 in (2.01 m)	210 lb (95 kg)	Fr	Briarcrest Christian School	Memphis, TN
F	5	Amanze Ngumezi	6 ft 9 in (2.06 m)	245 lb (111 kg)	Jr	Georgia	Savannah, GA
F	10	Juwan Perdue	6 ft 6 in (1.98 m)	200 lb (91 kg)	So	Lakewood HS	Sumter, SC
G/F	11	Kayne Henry	6 ft 7 in (2.01 m)	210 lb (95 kg)	Sr	Northwest Florida State	London, England
G/F	13	Jay Pal	6 ft 9 in (2.06 m)	190 lb (86 kg)	So	Clarendon College	Omaha, NE
G	15	JJ Platt	6 ft 1 in (1.85 m)	180 lb (82 kg)	Fr	The Webb School	Nashville, TN
G	23	Darian Adams	6 ft 3 in (1.91 m)	200 lb (91 kg)	Sr	Troy	Montgomery, AL
F	24	Martin Roub	6 ft 10 in (2.08 m)	235 lb (107 kg)	Sr	Western Nebraska	Kolín, Czech Republic
G/F	25	Khalil Johnson	6 ft 8 in (2.03 m)	200 lb (91 kg)	Jr	Shelton State	Cleveland, AL
F/C	50	Brandon Huffman	6 ft 10 in (2.08 m)	255 lb (116 kg)	Sr	North Carolina	Goldsboro, NC

Head coach

- Ray Harper (Kentucky Wesleyan)

Assistant coach(es)

- Tommy Wade (Southeast Missouri State)
- Jake Morton (Miami (FL))
- Tysor Anderson (Georgia Tech)

Legend

- (C) Team captain
- (S) Suspended
- (I) Ineligible
- (W) Walk-on
- Injured
- Current redshirt

Roster
Last update: January 5, 2021

== Schedule and results ==
Date time, TV	Rank^{#}	Opponent^{#}	Result	Record	Site (attendance) city, state
Regular season
November 25, 2020*; 7:00 p.m., SECN		at Alabama	L 57–81	0–1	Coleman Coliseum (2,025); Tuscaloosa, AL
November 27, 2020*; 12:00 p.m.		vs. Florida Atlantic; Goldie & Herman Ungar Memorial Tournament	W 60–50	1–1	Mitchell Center (138); Mobile, AL
November 29, 2020*; 4:00 p.m., ESPN+		at South Alabama; Goldie & Herman Ungar Memorial Tournament	W 77–73	2–1	Mitchell Center (910); Mobile, AL
November 30, 2020*; 2:00 p.m.		vs. Mobile; Goldie & Herman Ungar Memorial Tournament	W 85–66	3–1	Mitchell Center (124); Mobile, AL
December 4, 2020*; 6:00 p.m., CUSA.tv		at FIU	L 70–74	3–2	Ocean Bank Convocation Center (245); Miami, FL
December 6, 2020*; 1:00 p.m., CUSA.tv		at FIU	Canceled due to COVID-19		Ocean Bank Convocation Center; Miami, FL
December 13, 2020; 4:00 p.m., ESPN+		at Tennessee Tech	W 73–67	4–2 (1–0)	Eblen Center (624); Cookeville, TN
December 16, 2020; 7:30 p.m., ESPN+		Tennessee Tech	W 74–50	5–2 (2–0)	Pete Mathews Coliseum; Jacksonville, AL
December 18, 2020*; 6:00 p.m., ESPN+		Georgia Southwestern	Canceled due to COVID-19		Pete Mathews Coliseum; Jacksonville, AL
December 27, 2020*; 2:00 p.m., ESPN+		Carver	W 104–45	6–2	Pete Mathews Coliseum (547); Jacksonville, AL
December 30, 2020; 7:30 p.m., ESPN+		UT Martin	W 80–70	7–2 (3–0)	Pete Mathews Coliseum (588); Jacksonville, AL
January 7, 2021; 7:00 p.m., ESPN+		at Eastern Kentucky	L 66–69 ^{OT}	7–3 (3–1)	McBrayer Arena (672); Richmond, KY
January 9, 2021; 3:00 p.m., ESPN+		at Morehead State	L 55–56	7–4 (3–2)	Ellis Johnson Arena (445); Morehead, KY
January 14, 2020; 7:30 p.m., ESPN+		Tennessee State	W 65–64	8–4 (4–2)	Pete Mathews Coliseum (635); Jacksonville, AL
January 16, 2021; 4:00 p.m., ESPN+		Belmont	L 91–98	8–5 (4–3)	Pete Mathews Coliseum (516); Jacksonville, AL
January 21, 2021; 7:30 p.m., ESPN+		at Murray State	W 85–82	9–5 (5–3)	CFSB Center (1,290); Murray, KY
January 23, 2021; 4:00 p.m., ESPN+		at Austin Peay	W 76–70	10–5 (6–3)	Dunn Center (406); Clarksville, TN
January 28, 2021; 7:30 p.m., ESPN+		Morehead State	L 66–85	10–6 (6–4)	Pete Mathews Coliseum (456); Jacksonville, AL
February 2, 2021; 6:00 p.m., ESPN+		Eastern Kentucky	L 82–86 ^{OT}	10–7 (6–5)	Pete Mathews Coliseum (402); Jacksonville, AL
February 4, 2021; 8:00 p.m., ESPN+		at UT Martin	W 82–70	11–7 (7–5)	Skyhawk Arena (240); Martin, TN
February 6, 2021; 5:00 p.m., ESPN+		at Southeast Missouri State	W 66–54	12–7 (8–5)	Show Me Center (720); Cape Girardeau, MO
February 11, 2021; 7:30 p.m., ESPN+		Eastern Illinois	W 76–64	13–7 (9–5)	Pete Mathews Coliseum (421); Jacksonville, AL
February 13, 2021; 4:00 p.m., ESPN+		SIU Edwardsville	W 80–60	14–7 (10–5)	Pete Mathews Coliseum (513); Jacksonville, AL
February 18, 2021; 7:00 p.m., ESPN+		at Belmont	L 59–63	14–8 (10–6)	Curb Event Center (178); Nashville, TN
February 20, 2021; 4:00 p.m., ESPN+		at Tennessee State	W 77–76	15–8 (11–6)	Gentry Complex (431); Nashville, TN
February 25, 2021; 7:30 p.m., ESPN+		Murray State	W 87–74	16–8 (12–6)	Pete Mathews Coliseum (725); Jacksonville, AL
February 27, 2021; 4:00 p.m., ESPN+		Austin Peay	W 75–67	17–8 (13–6)	Pete Mathews Coliseum (311); Jacksonville, AL
OVC tournament
March 4, 2021; 7:00 p.m., ESPN+	(4)	vs. (5) Murray State; First round	W 68–65 ^{OT}	18–8	Ford Center (645); Evansville, IN
March 5, 2021; 7:00 p.m., ESPNU	(4)	vs. (1) Belmont; Semifinals	L 69–72	18–9	Ford Center; Evansville, IN
*Non-conference game. ^{#}Rankings from AP poll. (#) Tournament seedings in parentheses. All times are in Central.
