= 2020–21 Austin Peay Governors basketball team =

American college basketball season

2020–21 Austin Peay Governors basketball
- Conference: Ohio Valley Conference
- Record: 14–13 (10–10 OVC)
- Head coach: Matt Figger (4th season)
- Assistant coaches: Rod Clark; Darryl Dora; Nikita Johnson
- Home arena: Dunn Center

2020–21 Ohio Valley Conference men's basketball standings
	Conf.				Overall
Team	W		L	PCT	W		L	PCT
Belmont	18	–	2	.900	26	–	4	.867
Morehead State †	17	–	3	.850	23	–	8	.742
Eastern Kentucky	15	–	5	.750	22	–	7	.759
Jacksonville State	13	–	6	.684	18	–	9	.667
Austin Peay	10	–	10	.500	14	–	13	.519
Murray State	10	–	10	.500	13	–	13	.500
Southeast Missouri State	9	–	11	.450	11	–	16	.407
SIU Edwardsville	7	–	12	.368	9	–	17	.346
Eastern Illinois	6	–	14	.300	9	–	18	.333
UT Martin	6	–	14	.300	8	–	16	.333
Tennessee Tech	5	–	15	.250	5	–	22	.185
Tennessee State	3	–	17	.150	4	–	19	.174
† 2021 OVC tournament winner

The 2020–21 Austin Peay Governors basketball team represented Austin Peay State University in the 2020–21 NCAA Division I men's basketball season. The Governors, led by fourth-year head coach Matt Figger, played their home games at the Dunn Center in Clarksville, Tennessee as members of the Ohio Valley Conference.

== Previous season ==
The Governors finished the 2019–20 season 21–12, 14–4 in OVC play to finish in third place. They defeated Eastern Illinois in the quarterfinals of the OVC tournament to advance to the semifinals, where they lost to Murray State. With 21 wins, they were a candidate for postseason play. However, all postseason tournaments were cancelled amid the COVID-19 pandemic.

== Roster ==
2020–21 Austin Peay Governors men's basketball team
Players
Coaches

Pos.	#	Name	Height	Weight	Year	Previous school	Hometown
F	0	Elton Walker	6 ft 4 in (1.93 m)	200 lb (91 kg)	Jr	Miami Dade College	Miami, Florida
G	1	Carlos Paez	5 ft 10 in (1.78 m)	180 lb (82 kg)	So	Sunrise Christian Academy	Naguanagua, Venezuela
G	2	Tai'Reon Joseph	6 ft 1 in (1.85 m)	175 lb (79 kg)	Fr	Scotlandville Magnet High School	Baton Rouge, Louisiana
C	4	Merdy Mongozi	6 ft 10 in (2.08 m)	235 lb (107 kg)	Jr	South Georgia Technical College	Kinshasa, Congo
G	5	Jordyn Adams	6 ft 3 in (1.91 m)	200 lb (91 kg)	So	Silsbee High School	Silsbee, Texas
F	10	Ibrahima Jarjou	6 ft 8 in (2.03 m)	225 lb (102 kg)	Fr	Core4 Prep	Bignona, Senegal
F	11	Corbin Merritt	6 ft 8 in (2.03 m)	240 lb (109 kg)	RS Jr	Oklahoma	Lloyd, Florida
G	12	Reginald Gee	6 ft 3 in (1.91 m)	220 lb (100 kg)	GS	Alabama State	Houston, Texas
G	14	DJ Peavy	6 ft 2 in (1.88 m)	190 lb (86 kg)	RS So	Collin College	Cibolo, Texas
F	15	Mike Peake	6 ft 8 in (2.03 m)	220 lb (100 kg)	So	Georgia	Chicago, Illinois
G/F	21	Terry Taylor	6 ft 5 in (1.96 m)	230 lb (104 kg)	Sr	Bowling Green High School (KY)	Bowling Green, Kentucky
G	22	Alec Woodard	6 ft 2 in (1.88 m)	200 lb (91 kg)	So	Morgan County High School (GA)	Rutledge, Georgia
G	23	Jordan Burchfield	6 ft 1 in (1.85 m)	170 lb (77 kg)	RS Fr	Trevecca	Rockvale, Tennessee
G	24	Codey Bates	6 ft 2 in (1.88 m)	205 lb (93 kg)	So	Southwind High School	Memphis, Tennessee

Head coach

- Matt Figger (Eastern Kentucky)

Assistant coach(es)

- Rod Clark (Lindsey Wilson)
- Darryl Dora (Texas Tech)
- Nikita Johnson (West Georgia)

Legend

- (C) Team captain
- (S) Suspended
- (I) Ineligible
- (W) Walk-on
- Injured
- Current redshirt

Roster
Last update: January 3, 2021

== Schedule and results ==
Date time, TV	Rank^{#}	Opponent^{#}	Result	Record	Site (attendance) city, state
Regular season
November 25, 2020*; 1:00 pm, FloHoops		vs. Omaha; Gulf Coast Showcase	W 72–66	1–0	Hertz Arena (50); Estero, FL
November 26, 2020*; 1:00 pm, FloHoops		vs. East Tennessee State; Gulf Coast Showcase	W 67–66	2–0	Hertz Arena (50); Estero, FL
November 27, 2020*; 1:00 pm, FloHoops		vs. Abilene Christian; Gulf Coast Showcase	L 72–80	2–1	Hertz Arena (50); Estero, FL
December 4, 2020*; 6:00 pm, ESPN+		Carver	W 102–38	3–1	Dunn Center (647); Clarksville, TN
December 8, 2020; 7:30 pm, ESPN+		at Murray State	L 57–87	3–2 (0–1)	CFSB Center (1,290); Murray, KY
December 14, 2020*; 7:00 pm, ESPN+		McKendree	W 82–68	4–2	Dunn Center (444); Clarksville, TN
December 15, 2020*; 7:30 pm, ESPN+		Florida A&M	L 70–76	4–3	Dunn Center (478); Clarksville, TN
December 18, 2020*; ESPN+		McNeese State	Canceled		Dunn Center; Clarksville, TN
December 21, 2020; 8:00 pm, ESPNU		Murray State	W 74–70	5–3 (1–1)	Dunn Center (502); Clarksville, TN
December 30, 2020; 7:00 pm, ESPN+		at Tennessee State	W 68–59	6–3 (2–1)	Gentry Complex (230); Nashville, TN
January 2, 2021; 4:00 pm, ESPN+		Eastern Kentucky	L 75–80	6–4 (2–2)	Dunn Center (452); Clarksville, TN
January 9, 2021; 4:00 pm, ESPN+		at Eastern Illinois	W 74–71	7–4 (3–2)	Lantz Arena; Charleston, IL
January 21, 2021; 7:30 pm, ESPN+		Tennessee Tech	W 72–69	8–4 (4–2)	Dunn Center (518); Clarksville, TN
January 23, 2021; 4:00 pm, ESPN+		Jacksonville State	L 70–76	8–5 (4–3)	Dunn Center (406); Clarksville, TN
January 28, 2021; 7:30 pm, ESPNU		Belmont	L 76–81	8–6 (4–4)	Dunn Center (603); Clarksville, TN
January 30, 2021; 4:00 pm, ESPN+		Tennessee State	W 71–56	9–6 (5–4)	Dunn Center (703); Clarksville, TN
February 1, 2021; 2:00 pm, ESPN+		at SIU Edwardsville	W 74–59	10–6 (6–4)	First Community Arena; Edwardsville, IL
February 4, 2021; 7:00 pm, ESPN+		at Eastern Kentucky	W 94–79	11–6 (7–4)	McBrayer Arena (902); Richmond, KY
February 6, 2021; 3:00 pm, ESPN+		at Morehead State	L 74–75	11–7 (7–5)	Ellis Johnson Arena (717); Morehead, KY
February 8, 2021; 8:00 pm, ESPN+		at UT Martin	L 75–76	11–8 (7–6)	Skyhawk Arena (319); Martin, TN
February 11, 2021; 7:30 pm, ESPN+		UT Martin	W 71–50	12–8 (8–6)	Dunn Center (423); Clarksville, TN
February 13, 2021; 4:00 pm, ESPN+		Southeast Missouri State	W 78–63	13–8 (9–6)	Dunn Center (494); Clarksville, TN
February 16, 2021; 6:00 pm, ESPN+		at Southeast Missouri State	L 81–86 ^{OT}	13–9 (9–7)	Show Me Center (279); Cape Girardeau, MO
February 18, 2021; 7:30 pm, ESPN+		SIU Edwardsville	W 79–57	14–9 (10–7)	Dunn Center (307); Clarksville, TN
February 20, 2021; 4:00 pm, ESPN+		Eastern Illinois	L 69–76	14–10 (10–8)	Dunn Center (747); Clarksville, TN
February 25, 2021; 7:30 pm, ESPN+		at Tennessee Tech	L 76–81	14–11 (10–9)	Eblen Center (610); Cookeville, TN
February 27, 2021; 4:00 pm, ESPN+		at Jacksonville State	L 67–75	14–12 (10–10)	Pete Mathews Coliseum (311); Jacksonville, AL
OVC tournament
March 4, 2021; 9:30 pm, ESPN+	(6)	vs. (3) Eastern Kentucky; First round	L 67–70	14–13	Ford Center (645); Evansville, IN
*Non-conference game. ^{#}Rankings from AP Poll. (#) Tournament seedings in parentheses. All times are in Central.
