= 2020–21 Morehead State Eagles men's basketball team =

American college basketball season

2020–21 Morehead State Eagles men's basketball

OVC tournament champions

NCAA tournament, First Round
- Conference: Ohio Valley Conference
- Record: 23–8 (17–3 OVC)
- Head coach: Preston Spradlin (4th season)
- Assistant coaches: Scott Combs; Jonathan Mattox; Dominic Lombardi
- Home arena: Ellis Johnson Arena

2020–21 Ohio Valley Conference men's basketball standings
	Conf.				Overall
Team	W		L	PCT	W		L	PCT
Belmont	18	–	2	.900	26	–	4	.867
Morehead State †	17	–	3	.850	23	–	8	.742
Eastern Kentucky	15	–	5	.750	22	–	7	.759
Jacksonville State	13	–	6	.684	18	–	9	.667
Austin Peay	10	–	10	.500	14	–	13	.519
Murray State	10	–	10	.500	13	–	13	.500
Southeast Missouri State	9	–	11	.450	11	–	16	.407
SIU Edwardsville	7	–	12	.368	9	–	17	.346
Eastern Illinois	6	–	14	.300	9	–	18	.333
UT Martin	6	–	14	.300	8	–	16	.333
Tennessee Tech	5	–	15	.250	5	–	22	.185
Tennessee State	3	–	17	.150	4	–	19	.174
† 2021 OVC tournament winner

The 2020–21 Morehead State Eagles men's basketball team represented Morehead State University in the 2020–21 NCAA Division I men's basketball season. The Eagles, led by fourth-year head coach Preston Spradlin, played their home games at Ellis Johnson Arena in Morehead, Kentucky as members of the Ohio Valley Conference. They finished the season 23–8, 17–3 in OVC play to finish in 2nd place. They defeated Southeast Missouri State, Eastern Kentucky, and Belmont to be champions of the OVC tournament. They received the conference's automatic bid to the NCAA tournament where they lost in the first round to West Virginia.

== Previous season ==
The Eagles finished the 2019–20 season 13–19, 7–11 in OVC play to finish in eighth place. They lost in the first round of the OVC tournament to Tennessee State.

== Roster ==
2020–21 Morehead State Eagles men's basketball team
Players
Coaches

Pos.	#	Name	Height	Weight	Year	Previous school	Hometown
F	0	Tyzhaun Claude	6 ft 8 in (2.03 m)	240 lb (109 kg)	So	Moravian Prep	Goldsboro, NC
G	1	DeVon Cooper	6 ft 4 in (1.93 m)	201 lb (91 kg)	RS Jr	Waggener HS	Louisville, KY
G	2	KJ Hunt, Jr.	6 ft 3 in (1.91 m)	170 lb (77 kg)	RS Jr	McNeese State	Little Rock, AR
F	3	James Baker, Jr.	6 ft 6 in (1.98 m)	205 lb (93 kg)	Sr	Meade County HS	Brandenburg, KY
F	4	Johni Broome	6 ft 10 in (2.08 m)	235 lb (107 kg)	Fr	Tampa Catholic HS	Plant City, FL
G	5	Skyelar Potter	6 ft 3 in (1.91 m)	198 lb (90 kg)	Jr	Wright State	Bowling Green, KY
G	10	Marcus Garrett	6 ft 1 in (1.85 m)	201 lb (91 kg)	RS Jr	Wabash Valley College	Country Club Hills, IL
F	11	Julius Dixon	6 ft 7 in (2.01 m)	202 lb (92 kg)	So	Fayetteville HS (TN)	Fayetteville, TN
F	13	Jaden Stanley-Williams	6 ft 7 in (2.01 m)	215 lb (98 kg)	Jr	Columbia State CC	Great Falls, MT
G	20	Jacob Rice	5 ft 11 in (1.8 m)	180 lb (82 kg)	So	Johnson Central HS	Paintsville, KY
F	22	LJ Bryan	6 ft 9 in (2.06 m)	235 lb (107 kg)	Jr	State Fair CC	Cheltenham, MD
F	23	Jaylen Sebree	6 ft 7 in (2.01 m)	200 lb (91 kg)	Jr	Florida Atlantic	Hopkinsville, KY
G	25	Drew Thelwell	6 ft 3 in (1.91 m)	195 lb (88 kg)	Fr	The Master's Academy	Orlando, FL
G	55	Ta'lon Cooper	6 ft 4 in (1.93 m)	190 lb (86 kg)	So	Dorman HS	Spartanburg, SC

Head coach

- Preston Spradlin (Alice Lloyd)

Assistant coach(es)

- Scott Combs (Austin Peay)
- Jonathan Mattox (Emmanuel)
- Dominic Lombardi (Indiana–Pennsylvania)

Legend

- (C) Team captain
- (S) Suspended
- (I) Ineligible
- (W) Walk-on
- Injured
- Current redshirt

Roster
Last update: January 1, 2021

== Schedule and results ==
Date time, TV	Rank^{#}	Opponent^{#}	Result	Record	Site (attendance) city, state
Regular season
November 25, 2020*; 6:00 pm, SECN		at No. 10 Kentucky; Bluegrass Showcase	L 45–81	0–1	Rupp Arena (3,075); Lexington, KY
November 27, 2020*; 6:00 pm		vs. Richmond; Bluegrass Showcase	L 64–82	0–2	Rupp Arena (261); Lexington, KY
November 29, 2020*; 4:00 pm, ESPN+		Arkansas State	W 69–61	1–2	Ellis Johnson Arena (100); Morehead, KY
December 2, 2020*; 5:00 pm, BTN		at No. 23 Ohio State	L 44–77	1–3	Covelli Center; Columbus, OH
December 7, 2020; 7:00 pm, ESPN+		at Eastern Kentucky	L 68–71	1–4 (0–1)	McBrayer Arena (643); Richmond, KY
December 9, 2020*; 6:00 pm, ESPN+		Transylvania	W 77–55	2–4	Ellis Johnson Arena (420); Morehead, KY
December 10, 2020*; 6:00 pm, ESPN+		Transylvania	W 81–55	3–4	Ellis Johnson Arena (350); Morehead, KY
December 14, 2020; 6:00 pm, ESPN+		Eastern Kentucky	W 75–62	4–4 (1–1)	Ellis Johnson Arena; Morehead, KY
December 18, 2020; 6:00 pm, ESPN+		SIU Edwardsville	L 65–69	4–5 (1–2)	Ellis Johnson Arena (375); Morehead, KY
December 21, 2020*; 12:00 pm, ACCN		at Clemson	L 51–66	4–6	Littlejohn Coliseum (1,508); Clemson, SC
January 2, 2021; 5:00 pm, ESPN+		at Murray State	W 61–56	5–6 (2–2)	CFSB Center (872); Murray, KY
January 7, 2021; 7:00 pm, ESPN+		Tennessee Tech	W 57–54	6–6 (3–2)	Ellis Johnson Arena (480); Morehead, KY
January 9, 2021; 4:00 pm, ESPN+		Jacksonville State	W 56–55	7–6 (4–2)	Ellis Johnson Arena (445); Morehead, KY
January 14, 2021; 9:00 pm, ESPNU		at Eastern Illinois	W 87–61	8–6 (5–2)	Lantz Arena; Charleston, IL
January 16, 2021; 5:00 pm, ESPN+		at Southeast Missouri State	W 64–50	9–6 (6–2)	Show Me Center (799); Cape Girardeau, MO
January 21, 2021; 7:00 pm, ESPNU		Southeast Missouri State	W 76–65	10–6 (7–2)	Ellis Johnson Arena (775); Morehead, KY
January 23, 2021; 4:00 pm, ESPN+		UT Martin	W 76–44	11–6 (8–2)	Ellis Johnson Arena (500); Morehead, KY
January 28, 2021; 8:30 pm, ESPN+		at Jacksonville State	W 85–66	12–6 (9–2)	Pete Mathews Coliseum (456); Jacksonville, AL
January 30, 2021; 5:00 pm, ESPN+		at Tennessee Tech	W 74–55	13–6 (10–2)	Eblen Center (558); Cookeville, TN
February 4, 2021; 7:00 pm, ESPN+		Murray State	W 66–56	14–6 (11–2)	Ellis Johnson Arena (765); Morehead, KY
February 6, 2021; 4:00 pm, ESPN+		Austin Peay	W 75–74 ^{OT}	15–6 (12–2)	Ellis Johnson Arena (717); Morehead, KY
February 11, 2021; 9:00 pm, ESPN+		at Tennessee State	W 79–66	16–6 (13–2)	Gentry Complex (183); Nashville, TN
February 13, 2021; 5:00 pm, ESPN+		at Belmont	L 58–73	16–7 (13–3)	Curb Event Center (233); Nashville, TN
February 18, 2021; 9:00 pm, ESPN+		at UT Martin	W 79–69	17–7 (14–3)	Skyhawk Arena (166); Martin, TN
February 22, 2021; ESPN+		at SIU Edwardsville	W 56–48	18–7 (15–3)	First Community Arena (50); Edwardsville, IL
February 25, 2021; 7:00 pm, ESPN+		Tennessee State	W 74–60	19–7 (16–3)	Ellis Johnson Arena (665); Morehead, KY
February 27, 2021; 4:00 pm, ESPN+		Belmont	W 89–82 ^{2OT}	20–7 (17–3)	Ellis Johnson Arena (800); Morehead, KY
Ohio Valley tournament
March 3, 2021; 10:30 pm, ESPN+	(2)	vs. (7) Southeast Missouri State; First Round	W 61–54	21–7	Ford Center (266); Evansville, IN
March 5, 2021; 10:30 pm, ESPNU	(2)	vs. (3) Eastern Kentucky; Semifinals	W 67–64	22–7	Ford Center; Evansville, IN
March 6, 2021; 8:00 pm, ESPN2	(2)	vs. (1) Belmont; Championship	W 86–71	23–7	Ford Center; Evansville, IN
NCAA tournament
March 19, 2021*; 8:50 pm, truTV	(14 MW)	vs. (3 MW) No. 13 West Virginia; First Round	L 67–84	23–8	Lucas Oil Stadium; Indianapolis, IN
*Non-conference game. ^{#}Rankings from AP Poll. (#) Tournament seedings in parentheses. All times are in Eastern.
