= 2020–21 Eastern Illinois Panthers men's basketball team =

American college basketball season

2020–21 Eastern Illinois Panthers men's basketball
- Conference: Ohio Valley Conference
- Record: 9–18 (6–14 OVC)
- Head coach: Jay Spoonhour (9th season)
- Assistant coaches: Justin Brown; Matt Bringman; Mark Bernsen
- Home arena: Lantz Arena

2020–21 Ohio Valley Conference men's basketball standings
| | Conf. | | | | Overall |
| Team | W | | L | PCT | W | | L | PCT |
|---|---|---|---|---|---|---|---|---|
| Belmont | 18 | – | 2 | .900 | 26 | – | 4 | .867 |
| Morehead State † | 17 | – | 3 | .850 | 23 | – | 8 | .742 |
| Eastern Kentucky | 15 | – | 5 | .750 | 22 | – | 7 | .759 |
| Jacksonville State | 13 | – | 6 | .684 | 18 | – | 9 | .667 |
| Austin Peay | 10 | – | 10 | .500 | 14 | – | 13 | .519 |
| Murray State | 10 | – | 10 | .500 | 13 | – | 13 | .500 |
| Southeast Missouri State | 9 | – | 11 | .450 | 11 | – | 16 | .407 |
| SIU Edwardsville | 7 | – | 12 | .368 | 9 | – | 17 | .346 |
| Eastern Illinois | 6 | – | 14 | .300 | 9 | – | 18 | .333 |
| UT Martin | 6 | – | 14 | .300 | 8 | – | 16 | .333 |
| Tennessee Tech | 5 | – | 15 | .250 | 5 | – | 22 | .185 |
| Tennessee State | 3 | – | 17 | .150 | 4 | – | 19 | .174 |
† 2021 OVC tournament winner

The 2020–21 Eastern Illinois Panthers men's basketball team represented Eastern Illinois University in the 2020–21 NCAA Division I men's basketball season. The Panthers, led by ninth-year head coach Jay Spoonhour, played their home games at Lantz Arena in Charleston, Illinois as members of the Ohio Valley Conference (OVC). They finished the season 9–18, 6–14 in OVC play, to finish in a tie for ninth place. They failed to qualify for the OVC tournament.

On March 4, 2021, the school announced that they would not renew head coach Jay Spoonhour's contract. Nearly a month later, the school named Clemson assistant and former Evansville head coach Marty Simmons the team's new head coach.

== Previous season ==
The Panthers finished the 2019–20 season 17–15, 9–9 in OVC play, to finish in a tie for fifth place. They defeated Jacksonville State in the first round of the OVC tournament, before losing in the quarterfinals to Austin Peay.

== Roster ==
2020–21 Eastern Illinois Panthers men's basketball team
Players
Coaches

| Pos. | # | Name | Height | Weight | Year | Previous school | Hometown |
|---|---|---|---|---|---|---|---|
| G | 1 | Kashawn Charles | 6 ft 1 in (1.85 m) | 185 lb (84 kg) | Sr | Labette CC | Wyandanch, NY |
| F | 2 | Jordan Skipper-Brown | 6 ft 6 in (1.98 m) | 230 lb (104 kg) | Sr | McLennan CC | Killeen, TX |
| G | 3 | Mack Smith | 6 ft 2 in (1.88 m) | 185 lb (84 kg) | Sr | Warren Central HS | Indianapolis, IN |
| G | 4 | Marvin Johnson | 6 ft 6 in (1.98 m) | 190 lb (86 kg) | Sr | Coffeyville CC | Ardmore, OK |
| G | 5 | Junior Farquhar | 6 ft 3 in (1.91 m) | 200 lb (91 kg) | Jr | South Plains College | Mono, ON |
| G | 10 | Ryan Leonard | 6 ft 4 in (1.93 m) | 200 lb (91 kg) | So | Santa Fe College | County Kerry |
| F | 11 | Barlow IV Alleruzzo | 6 ft 9 in (2.06 m) | 235 lb (107 kg) | Jr | Des Moines Area CC | Chicago, IL |
| G | 12 | Micah Schnyders | 6 ft 4 in (1.93 m) | 185 lb (84 kg) | Fr | Yorkville Christian HS | Yorkville, IL |
| G | 13 | Henry Abraham | 6 ft 0 in (1.83 m) | 175 lb (79 kg) | Fr | Cambridge-Isanti HS | Cambridge, MN |
| G | 14 | Isaac Miller | 6 ft 3 in (1.91 m) | 180 lb (82 kg) | Fr | Charleston HS | Charleston, IL |
| F | 20 | Sammy IV Friday | 6 ft 9 in (2.06 m) | 240 lb (109 kg) | GS | Siena | Jersey City, NJ |
| F | 21 | Madani Diarra | 6 ft 10 in (2.08 m) | 240 lb (109 kg) | So | Saint Louis | Bamako, Mali |
| G | 22 | Josiah Wallace | 6 ft 4 in (1.93 m) | 185 lb (84 kg) | Sr | Olney Central College | Marshall, IL |
| G | 25 | Deang Deang | 6 ft 4 in (1.93 m) | 185 lb (84 kg) | Sr | Highland CC | Madison, WI |
| G | 35 | George Dixon | 6 ft 5 in (1.96 m) | 230 lb (104 kg) | Sr | Vincennes | Milwaukee, WI |

Head coach

- Jay Spoonhour (Pittsburg State)

Assistant coach(es)

- Justin Brown (Southwest Baptist)
- Matt Bringman (Palm Beach Atlantic)
- Mark Bernsen (Missouri–St. Louis)

Legend

- (C) Team captain
- (S) Suspended
- (I) Ineligible
- (W) Walk-on
- Injured
- Current redshirt

Roster
Last update: January 16, 2021

== Schedule and results ==
| Date time, TV | Rank^{#} | Opponent^{#} | Result | Record | Site (attendance) city, state |
Non-conference regular season
| November 25, 2020*; 9:00 p.m., BTN | | at No. 7 Wisconsin | L 67–77 | 0–1 | Kohl Center; Madison, WI |
| November 27, 2020*; 6:30 p.m., FS1 | | at Marquette | L 50–75 | 0–2 | Fiserv Forum; Milwaukee, WI |
| November 29, 2020*; 5:30 p.m., FS1 | | at Butler | Postponed due to COVID-19 | | Hinkle Fieldhouse; Indianapolis, IN |
| December 1, 2020*; 6:00 p.m., ESPN+ | | at Dayton | L 63–66 | 0–3 | UD Arena; Dayton, OH |
| December 3, 2020*; 2:00 p.m., ESPN+ | | Chicago State | W 78–56 | 1–3 | Lantz Arena; Charleston, IL |
| December 5, 2020*; 2:00 p.m., ESPN3 | | at Green Bay | W 93–91 ^{2OT} | 2–3 | Kress Events Center; Green Bay, WI |
| December 9, 2020*; 6:00 p.m., ESPN+ | | at Evansville | L 65–68 | 2–4 | Ford Center; Evansville, IN |
| December 12, 2020*; 4:00 p.m., ESPN+ | | Western Illinois | W 92–88 | 3–4 | Lantz Arena; Charleston, IL |
Ohio Valley regular season
| December 30, 2020; 7:00 p.m., ESPN+ | | at Eastern Kentucky | L 61–69 | 3–5 (0–1) | McBrayer Arena (704); Richmond, KY |
| January 2, 2021; 4:00 p.m., ESPN+ | | Tennessee Tech | W 87–81 | 4–5 (1–1) | Lantz Arena; Charleston, IL |
| January 7, 2021; 7:30 p.m., ESPN+ | | Murray State | W 74–68 | 5–5 (2–1) | Lantz Arena; Charleston, IL |
| January 9, 2021; 4:00 p.m., ESPN+ | | Austin Peay | L 71–74 | 5–6 (2–2) | Lantz Arena; Charleston, IL |
| January 14, 2021; 8:00 p.m., ESPNU | | Morehead State | L 61–87 | 5–7 (2–3) | Lantz Arena; Charleston, IL |
| January 16, 2021; 4:00 p.m., ESPN+ | | Eastern Kentucky | L 85–93 ^{OT} | 5–8 (2–4) | Lantz Arena; Charleston, IL |
| January 21, 2021; 7:00 p.m., ESPN+ | | at Belmont | L 66–79 | 5–9 (2–5) | Curb Event Center (247); Nashville, TN |
| January 23, 2021; 4:00 p.m., ESPN+ | | at Tennessee State | L 54–65 | 5–10 (2–6) | Gentry Complex (338); Nashville, TN |
| January 26, 2021; 7:00 p.m., ESPN+ | | SIU Edwardsville | L 74–87 | 5–11 (2–7) | Lantz Arena; Charleston, IL |
| January 28, 2021; 8:00 p.m., ESPN+ | | at UT Martin | L 41–51 | 5–12 (2–8) | Skyhawk Arena (360); Martin, TN |
| January 30, 2021; 5:00 p.m., ESPN+ | | at Southeast Missouri State | L 44–75 | 5–13 (2–9) | Show Me Center (842); Cape Girardeau, MO |
| February 2, 2021; 4:00 p.m., ESPN+ | | at SIU Edwardsville | W 70–61 | 6–13 (3–9) | First Community Arena; Edwardsville, IL |
| February 4, 2021; 7:30 p.m., ESPN+ | | Belmont | L 61–89 | 6–14 (3–10) | Lantz Arena (12); Charleston, IL |
| February 6, 2021; 4:00 p.m., ESPN+ | | Tennessee State | W 86–72 | 7–14 (4–10) | Lantz Arena (19); Charleston, IL |
| February 11, 2021; 7:30 p.m., ESPN+ | | at Jacksonville State | L 64–76 | 7–15 (4–11) | Pete Mathews Coliseum (421); Jacksonville, AL |
| February 13, 2021; 4:00 p.m., ESPN+ | | at Tennessee Tech | L 67–80 | 7–16 (4–12) | Eblen Center (550); Cookeville, TN |
| February 18, 2021; 7:30 p.m., ESPN+ | | at Murray State | W 68–59 | 8–16 (5–12) | CFSB Center (1,260); Murray, KY |
| February 20, 2021; 4:00 p.m., ESPN+ | | at Austin Peay | W 76–69 | 9–16 (6–12) | Dunn Center (747); Clarksville, TN |
| February 25, 2021; 7:30 p.m., ESPN+ | | Southeast Missouri State | L 88–94 | 9–17 (6–13) | Lantz Arena (29); Charleston, IL |
| February 27, 2021; 4:00 p.m., ESPN+ | | UT Martin | L 68–73 | 9–18 (6–14) | Lantz Arena (50); Charleston, IL |
*Non-conference game. ^{#}Rankings from AP poll. (#) Tournament seedings in parentheses. All times are in Central.
