= 2020–21 Belmont Bruins men's basketball team =

American college basketball season

2020–21 Belmont Bruins men's basketball

OVC regular season champions
- Conference: Ohio Valley Conference
- Record: 26–4 (18–2 OVC)
- Head coach: Casey Alexander (2nd season)
- Associate head coach: Brian Ayers
- Assistant coaches: Sean Rutigliano; Tyler Holloway
- Home arena: Curb Event Center

2020–21 Ohio Valley Conference men's basketball standings
	Conf.				Overall
Team	W		L	PCT	W		L	PCT
Belmont	18	–	2	.900	26	–	4	.867
Morehead State †	17	–	3	.850	23	–	8	.742
Eastern Kentucky	15	–	5	.750	22	–	7	.759
Jacksonville State	13	–	6	.684	18	–	9	.667
Austin Peay	10	–	10	.500	14	–	13	.519
Murray State	10	–	10	.500	13	–	13	.500
Southeast Missouri State	9	–	11	.450	11	–	16	.407
SIU Edwardsville	7	–	12	.368	9	–	17	.346
Eastern Illinois	6	–	14	.300	9	–	18	.333
UT Martin	6	–	14	.300	8	–	16	.333
Tennessee Tech	5	–	15	.250	5	–	22	.185
Tennessee State	3	–	17	.150	4	–	19	.174
† 2021 OVC tournament winner

The 2020–21 Belmont Bruins men's basketball team represented Belmont University in the 2020–21 NCAA Division I men's basketball season. The Bruins, led by second-year head coach Casey Alexander, played their home games at the Curb Event Center in Nashville, Tennessee as members of the Ohio Valley Conference. In a season limited due to the ongoing COVID-19 pandemic, the Bruins finished the season 26–4, 18–2 in OVC play to win the regular season championship. They defeated SIU–Edwardsville and Jacksonville State before losing to Morehead State in the OVC tournament championship game. Because of a limited National Invitation Tournament due to COVID-19, the Bruins did not receive an automatic bid to the NIT for being regular season champions. They did not receive an at-large bid to the NIT either.

== Previous season ==
The Bruins finished the 2019–20 season 26–7, 15–3 in OVC play to finish in a tie for the regular season championship. They defeated Eastern Kentucky and Murray State to win the championship of the OVC tournament. As a result, they received the conference's automatic bid to the NCAA tournament. However, the NCAA Tournament was canceled due to the COVID-19 pandemic.

== Roster ==
2020–21 Belmont Bruins men's basketball team
Players
Coaches

Pos.	#	Name	Height	Weight	Year	Hometown
C	0	Even Brauns	6 ft 9 in (2.06 m)	250 lb (113 kg)	Fr	Iowa City, Iowa
G	1	Mitch Listau	6 ft 4 in (1.93 m)	195 lb (88 kg)	So	Waunakee, Wisconsin
G	2	Grayson Murphy	6 ft 2 in (1.88 m)	175 lb (79 kg)	RS Jr	Franklin, Tennessee
G	3	Luke Smith	6 ft 0 in (1.83 m)	175 lb (79 kg)	RS Jr	Knoxville, Tennessee
F	10	Caleb Hollander	6 ft 8 in (2.03 m)	235 lb (107 kg)	Jr	Nashville, Tennessee
F	11	Michael Shanks	6 ft 6 in (1.98 m)	205 lb (93 kg)	RS Fr	Bentonville, Arkansas
G	12	EJ Bellinger	6 ft 4 in (1.93 m)	195 lb (88 kg)	So	St. Peters, Missouri
G	20	Tate Pierson	6 ft 6 in (1.98 m)	210 lb (95 kg)	Jr	Brentwood, Tennessee
F	21	Derek Sabin	6 ft 9 in (2.06 m)	230 lb (104 kg)	RS So	Slinger, Wisconsin
G	22	Ben Sheppard	6 ft 6 in (1.98 m)	185 lb (84 kg)	So	Atlanta, Georgia
G	24	JaCobi Wood	6 ft 2 in (1.88 m)	180 lb (82 kg)	Fr	Cleveland, Tennessee
F	25	Frank Jakubicek	6 ft 8 in (2.03 m)	235 lb (107 kg)	Fr	Cary, Illinois
C	33	Nick Muszynski	6 ft 11 in (2.11 m)	235 lb (107 kg)	RS Jr	Pickerington, Ohio
F	42	Rilee Epley	6 ft 4 in (1.93 m)	195 lb (88 kg)	So	Newburgh, Indiana

Head coach

- Casey Alexander (Belmont)

Assistant coach(es)

- Brian Ayers (Lipscomb)
- Sean Rutigliano (Cortland State)
- Tyler Holloway (Murray State)

Legend

- (C) Team captain
- (S) Suspended
- (I) Ineligible
- (W) Walk-on
- Injured
- Current redshirt

Roster
Last update: December 8, 2020

== Schedule and results ==
Date time, TV	Rank^{#}	Opponent^{#}	Result	Record	Site (attendance) city, state
Regular season
November 26, 2020*; 4:00 pm, ESPN3		vs. Howard; DC Paradise Jam	W 95–78	1–0	Washington Convention Center; Washington, D.C.
November 27, 2020*; 1:00 pm, ESPN3		vs. George Mason; DC Paradise Jam	W 77–67	2–0	Washington Convention Center; Washington, D.C.
November 28, 2020*; 11:00 am, ESPN3		vs. Queens (NC); DC Paradise Jam	W 73–61	3–0	Washington Convention Center; Washington, D.C.
December 5, 2020*; 4:00 pm, ESPN+		Samford	L 83–96	3–1	Curb Event Center; Nashville, TN
December 8, 2020; 6:30 pm, ESPN+		Tennessee State	W 79–64	4–1 (1–0)	Curb Event Center (250); Nashville, TN
December 12, 2020*; 7:00 pm, ESPN+		at Lipscomb; Battle of the Boulevard	W 81–71	5–1	Allen Arena; Nashville, TN
December 16, 2020*; 6:30 pm, ESPN3		Kennesaw State	W 64–53	6–1	Curb Event Center; Nashville, TN
December 18, 2020; 6:30 pm, ESPN+		at Tennessee State	W 88–63	7–1 (2–0)	Gentry Center (224); Nashville, TN
December 21, 2020*; 6:00 pm, ESPN+		at Evansville	W 72–63	8–1	Ford Center; Evansville, IN
December 30, 2020; 6:00 pm, ESPN+		Murray State	W 68–55	9–1 (3–0)	Curb Event Center (756); Nashville, TN
January 2, 2021; 4:00 pm, ESPN+		at UT Martin	W 90–69	10–1 (4–0)	Skyhawk Arena (165); Martin, TN
January 7, 2021; 7:00 pm, ESPN+		Southeast Missouri State	W 77–66	11–1 (5–0)	Curb Event Center (271); Nashville, TN
January 9, 2021; 4:00 pm, ESPN+		UT Martin	W 89–69	12–1 (6–0)	Curb Event Center (141); Nashville, TN
January 14, 2021; 8:00 pm, ESPN+		at Tennessee Tech	W 88–67	13–1 (7–0)	Eblen Center (589); Cookeville, TN
January 16, 2021; 4:00 pm, ESPN+		at Jacksonville State	W 98–91	14–1 (8–0)	Pete Mathews Coliseum (516); Jacksonville, AL
January 21, 2021; 7:00 pm, ESPN+		Eastern Illinois	W 79–66	15–1 (9–0)	Curb Event Center (247); Nashville, TN
January 23, 2021; 4:00 pm, ESPN+		SIU Edwardsville	W 114–62	16–1 (10–0)	Curb Event Center (244); Nashville, TN
January 28, 2021; 7:30 pm, ESPNU		at Austin Peay	W 81–76	17–1 (11–0)	Dunn Center (603); Clarksville, TN
January 30, 2021; 7:30 pm, ESPN+		at Murray State	W 72–71	18–1 (12–0)	CFSB Center (1,290); Murray, KY
February 4, 2021; 7:30 pm, ESPN+		at Eastern Illinois	W 89–61	19–1 (13–0)	Lantz Arena (12); Charleston, IL
February 6, 2021; 1:00 pm, ESPN+		at SIU Edwardsville	W 94–62	20–1 (14–0)	First Community Arena (50); Edwardsville, IL
February 11, 2020; 7:00 pm, ESPN+		Eastern Kentucky	W 92–74	21–1 (15–0)	Curb Event Center (241); Nashville, TN
February 13, 2021; 4:00 pm, ESPN+		Morehead State	W 73–58	22–1 (16–0)	Curb Event Center (233); Nashville, TN
February 18, 2021; 7:00 pm, ESPN+		Jacksonville State	W 63–59	23–1 (17–0)	Curb Event Center (178); Nashville, TN
February 20, 2021; 4:00 pm, ESPN+		Tennessee Tech	W 90–66	24–1 (18–0)	Curb Event Center (231); Nashville, TN
February 25, 2021; 7:00 pm, ESPN+		at Eastern Kentucky	L 67–81	24–2 (18–1)	McBrayer Arena (957); Richmond, KY
February 27, 2021; 3:00 pm, ESPN+		at Morehead State	L 82–89 ^{2OT}	24–3 (18–2)	Ellis Johnson Arena (800); Morehead, KY
Ohio Valley Conference tournament
March 3, 2021; 7:00 pm, ESPN+	(1)	vs. (8) SIU Edwardsville; First Round	W 78–61	25–3	Ford Center (266); Evansville, IN
March 5, 2021; 7:00 pm, ESPNU	(1)	vs. (4) Jacksonville State; Semifinals	W 72–69	26–3	Ford Center; Evansville, IN
March 6, 2021; 8:00 pm, ESPN2	(1)	vs. (2) Morehead State; Championship	L 71–86	26–4	Ford Center; Evansville, IN
*Non-conference game. ^{#}Rankings from AP Poll. (#) Tournament seedings in parentheses. All times are in Central.
