= Matt Figger =

American college basketball coach (born 1970)

Current position
- Title: Assistant coach
- Team: UMass Minutemen
- Conference: Atlantic 10

Biographical details
- Born: January 22, 1970 (age 56); Jenkins, Kentucky, U.S.
- Education: Eastern Kentucky

Coaching career (HC unless noted)
- 1993–1994: Wabash Valley (assistant)
- 1994–1999: Vincennes (assistant)
- 2000–2002: Odessa (assistant)
- 2003–2007: South Alabama (assistant)
- 2007: Arkansas (assistant)
- 2007–2012: Kansas State (assistant)
- 2012–2017: South Carolina (assistant)
- 2017–2021: Austin Peay
- 2021–2024: UT Rio Grande Valley
- 2024–present: UMass (assistant)

Head coaching record
- Overall: 105–116 (.475)
- Tournaments: 1–1 (CIT)

Accomplishments and honors

Awards
- OVC Coach of the Year (2018)

Robert Matthew Figger (born January 22, 1970) is an American college basketball coach who is an assistant coach for the UMass Minutemen. He previously served as the head coach at Austin Peay and at UT Rio Grande Valley.

== Coaching career ==
Figger got his college coaching start at Wabash Valley in 1993 as an assistant coach, before moving on to Vincennes and Odessa College to serve as an assistant coach. Figger also had assistant coaching stops at South Alabama, and Arkansas before landing on Frank Martin's staff at Kansas State. Figger followed Martin as an assistant coach to South Carolina. Figger was a part of the Gamecocks Final Four appearance in the 2017 NCAA tournament.

On April 6, 2017, Figger was named the 12th head coach in Austin Peay history, taking over for longtime coach Dave Loos.

In March 2021, Figger left Austin Peay to become the head coach at UT Rio Grande Valley.

On May 21, 2024, Figger was officially named as an assistant coach for the UMass Minutemen under head coach Frank Martin.

== Head coaching record ==
Record table
Season	Team	Overall	Conference	Standing	Postseason
Austin Peay Governors (Ohio Valley Conference) (2017–2021)
2017–18	Austin Peay	19–15	12–6	3rd	CIT quarterfinal
2018–19	Austin Peay	22–11	13–5	4th	
2019–20	Austin Peay	21–12	14–4	3rd	
2020–21	Austin Peay	14–13	10–10	T–5th	
Austin Peay:		76–51 (.598)	49–25 (.662)		
Texas–Rio Grande Valley Vaqueros/UT Rio Grande Valley Vaqueros (WAC) (2021–2024)
2021–22	Texas–Rio Grande Valley	8–23	3–15	T–11th	
2022–23	Texas–Rio Grande Valley	15–17	6–12	T–10th	
2023–24	UT Rio Grande Valley	6–25	2–18	11th	
Texas–Rio Grande Valley:		29–65 (.309)	11–45 (.196)		
Total:		105–116 (.475)			
