= 2021 Ohio Valley Conference men's basketball tournament =

- Classification: Division I
- Season: 2020–21
- Teams: 8
- Site: Ford Center; Evansville, Indiana
- Champions: Morehead State (5th title)
- Winning coach: Preston Spradlin (1st title)
- MVP: Johni Broome (Morehead State)
- Television: ESPN+, ESPNU, ESPN2

2020–21 Ohio Valley Conference men's basketball standings
	Conf.				Overall
Team	W		L	PCT	W		L	PCT
Belmont	18	–	2	.900	26	–	4	.867
Morehead State †	17	–	3	.850	23	–	8	.742
Eastern Kentucky	15	–	5	.750	22	–	7	.759
Jacksonville State	13	–	6	.684	18	–	9	.667
Austin Peay	10	–	10	.500	14	–	13	.519
Murray State	10	–	10	.500	13	–	13	.500
Southeast Missouri State	9	–	11	.450	11	–	16	.407
SIU Edwardsville	7	–	12	.368	9	–	17	.346
Eastern Illinois	6	–	14	.300	9	–	18	.333
UT Martin	6	–	14	.300	8	–	16	.333
Tennessee Tech	5	–	15	.250	5	–	22	.185
Tennessee State	3	–	17	.150	4	–	19	.174
† 2021 OVC tournament winner

The 2021 Ohio Valley Conference men's basketball tournament was the final event of the 2020–21 NCAA Division I men's basketball season in the Ohio Valley Conference. The tournament was held March 3 through March 6, 2021 at the Ford Center in Evansville, Indiana.

== Seeds ==
Only the top eight teams in the conference qualified for the tournament. Teams were seeded by record within the conference, with a tiebreaker system to seed teams with identical conference records.

Seed	School	Conf.	Tiebreaker
1	Belmont	18–2	
2	Morehead State	17–3	
3	Eastern Kentucky	15–5	
4	Jacksonville State	13–6	
5	Murray State	10–10	
6	Austin Peay	10–10	
7	Southeast Missouri State	9–11	
8	SIUE	7–12	

== Schedule ==
Game	Time	Matchup	Score	Television
First Round – Wednesday, March 3
1	7:00 pm	No. 1 Belmont vs. No. 8 SIUE	78–61	ESPN+
2	9:30 pm	No. 2 Morehead State vs. No. 7 Southeast Missouri State	61–54	ESPN+
First Round – Thursday, March 4
3	7:00 pm	No. 4 Jacksonville State vs. No. 5 Murray State	68–65^{OT}	ESPN+
4	9:30 pm	No. 3 Eastern Kentucky vs. No. 6 Austin Peay	70–67	ESPN+
Semifinals – Friday, March 5
5	7:00 pm	No. 1 Belmont vs. No. 4 Jacksonville State	72–67	ESPNU
6	9:30 pm	No. 2 Morehead State vs. No. 3 Eastern Kentucky	67–64	ESPNU
Championship – Saturday, March 6
7	7:00 pm	No. 1 Belmont vs. No. 2 Morehead State	71–86	ESPN2
All game times in Central Time.

== Bracket ==
First round Wednesday & Thursday, March 3 & 4 ESPN+
1	Belmont	78
8	SIU Edwardsville	61
4	Jacksonville State	68*
5	Murray State	65
2	Morehead State	61
7	Southeast Missouri State	54
3	Eastern Kentucky	70
6	Austin Peay	67

Semifinals; Friday, March 5 ESPNU
1	Belmont	72
4	Jacksonville State	69
2	Morehead State	67
3	Eastern Kentucky	64

Championship; Saturday, March 6 ESPN2
1	Belmont	71
2	Morehead State	86

* denotes number of overtime periods
