= Ellis Johnson Arena =

Multi-purpose arena in Morehead, Kentucky

Academic & Athletic Center
- Ellis T. Johnson Arena
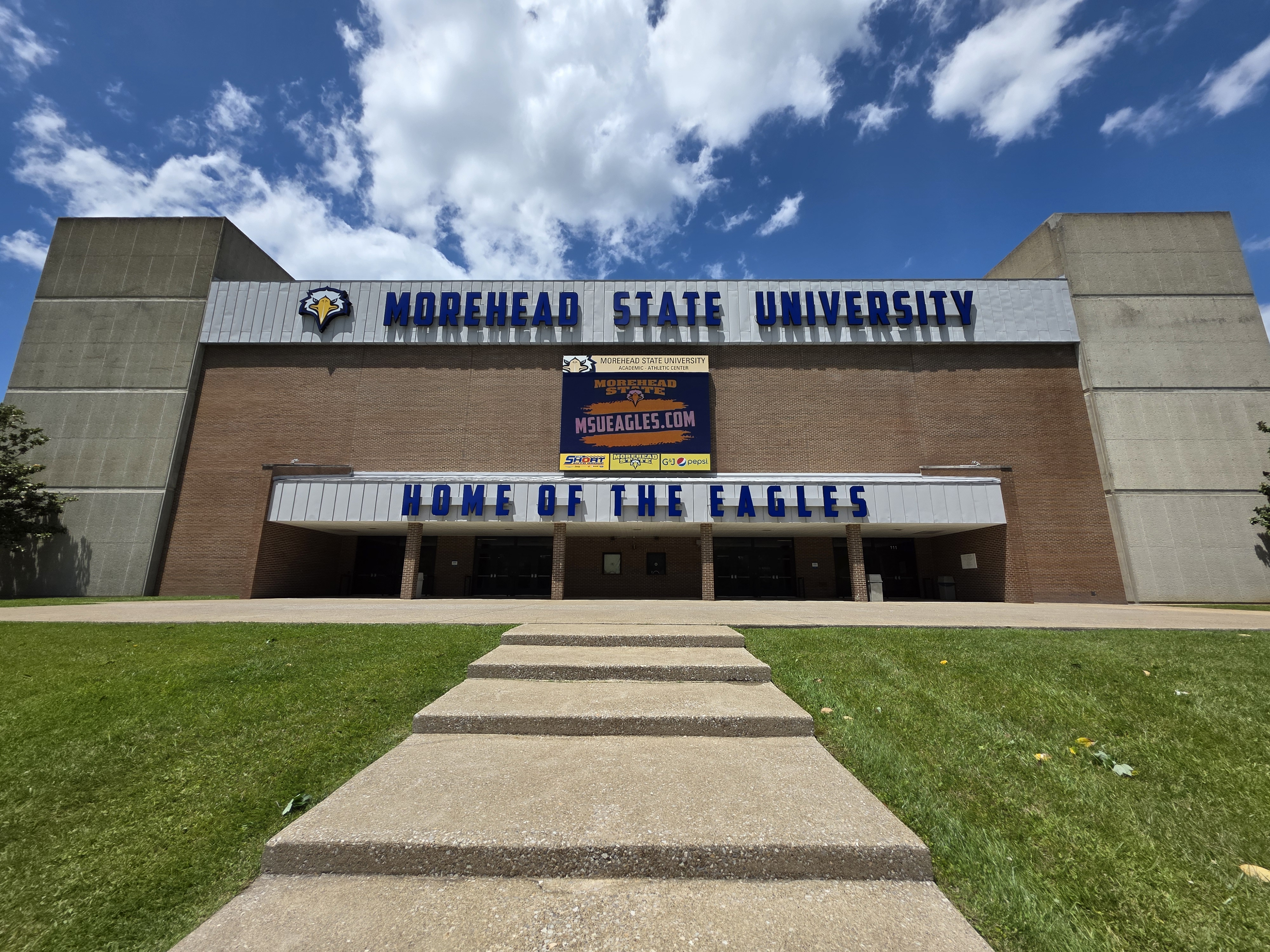
- Interactive map of Academic & Athletic Center
- Location: 111 Playforth Pl; Morehead, Kentucky 40351
- Coordinates: 38.188786°N 83.429006°W
- Owner: Morehead State University
- Operator: Morehead State University
- Capacity: 6,500

Construction
- Groundbreaking: 1978
- Built: 1978–1981
- Opened: December 3, 1981

Tenants
- Morehead State Eagles men's and women's basketball and volleyball

Ellis T. Johnson Arena is a 6,500-seat multi-purpose arena in Morehead, Kentucky, United States. Located in the Academic-Athletic Center on the campus of Morehead State University, it is the home to the Morehead State Eagles men's and women's basketball teams along with women's volleyball. Construction began in 1978, and the building opened in 1981. The Eagles won their inaugural game in the building on December 3, 1981, over the University of Charleston. Johnson Arena can be easily transformed into an auditorium for concerts and commencements. At the east end of the playing floor, a hydraulic stage can be raised for events.

Johnson Arena largely replaced Wetherby Gymnasium. It hosted the Ohio Valley Conference men's basketball tournament in 1984, and has also hosted such entertainment acts as Alabama, David Letterman, M.C. Hammer, the Goo Goo Dolls, Alan Jackson, Dashboard Confessional, Jeff Foxworthy, Tim McGraw, Travis Tritt and Sawyer Brown.

The arena is named after former Morehead State basketball, baseball, and football coach, Ellis T. Johnson.

== See also ==
- List of NCAA Division I basketball arenas
