= Curb Event Center =

Multipurpose arena on the campus of Belmont University

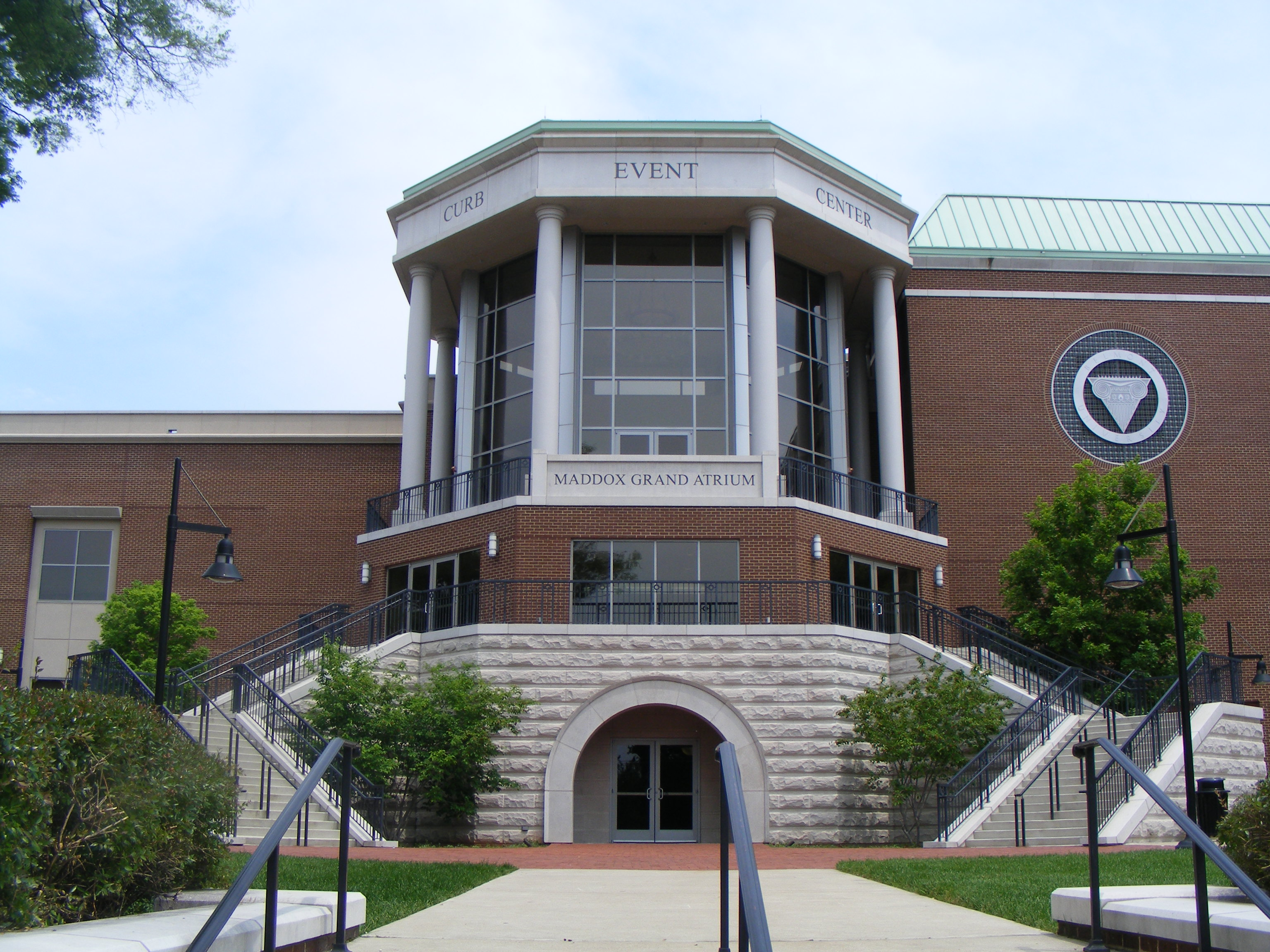
- Interactive map of Curb Event Center
- Location: 2002 Belmont Boulevard; Nashville, TN 37212
- Coordinates: 36°7′56″N 86°47′40″W
- Owner: Belmont University
- Operator: Belmont University
- Capacity: 5,085
- Surface: Maple

Construction
- Groundbreaking: August 18, 2001
- Opened: September 8, 2003
- Cost: $47.4 million ($83 million in 2025 dollars)
- Architects: Earl Swensson Associates; Cannon Design
- Structural engineer: KSi Structural Engineers
- Services engineer: Littlejohn Engineering Associates
- General contractor: Hardaway Construction Corp.

Tenant
- Belmont Bruins (2003–present)

The Curb Event Center is a multipurpose arena on the campus of Belmont University in Nashville, Tennessee.

Named in honor of its prime donor, music executive and former lieutenant governor of California Mike Curb, the arena was completed in 2003, replacing the former Striplin Gym. It is the home venue of Belmont's men's and women's basketball and volleyball teams and hosted the 2004 and 2005 Atlantic Sun Conference men's basketball tournaments. In June 2004 it hosted some of the junior and preliminary events of the U.S.Gymnastics Championships. It seats 5,085 people for sporting events and hundreds more for events such as concerts and graduations where much of the floor is available for seating. It also hosts the graduation of the seniors of several local schools, including East Literature Magnet, Antioch High School, John Overton Comprehensive High School and Ravenwood High School.

On April 10, 2006, the arena hosted the nationally televised CMT Music Awards for the first time and in September 2011 featured special guest and keynote speaker Dr. Maya Angelou in celebration of its 10th Annual Humanities Symposium.

Curb Event Center hosted a United States presidential debate in 2008 and hosted another in 2020.

== See also ==
- List of NCAA Division I basketball arenas
