= Dunn Center =

Sports venue in Clarksville, Tennessee

- The House That Fly Built
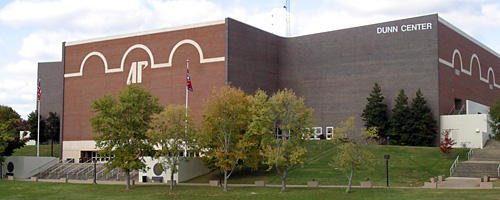
- Interactive map of Dunn Center
- Full name: Winfield Dunn Health and Physical Education Building and Convocation Complex
- Location: Clarksville, Tennessee
- Coordinates: 36°32′10″N 87°21′25″W
- Owner: Austin Peay State University
- Capacity: 7,257
- Executive suites: 0
- Surface: Wood
- Scoreboard: Yes

Construction
- Groundbreaking: February 1973
- Opened: 1975
- Cost: $5.3 million

Tenants
- Austin Peay Governors basketball (1975–2023) and volleyball (1975–present)

Website
- http://www.letsgopeay.com

The Winfield Dunn Center (officially the Winfield Dunn Health and Physical Education Building and Convocation Complex) is a 132,000-square-foot (12,300 m^{2}) facility, located on the main campus of Austin Peay State University in Clarksville, Tennessee. Construction began on the (then) $5.3 million facility in 1973, and the building opened in 1975. It was home to the Austin Peay Governors men's and women's basketball teams through the 2022–23 season, and is home to Peay's women's volleyball team. It also serves as an indoor practice facility for the baseball, softball, and track and field teams. It also houses the athletics department's weight room and the David P. Roe Academic Services Center which was named for alumnus Phil Roe. The building was named for the governor of Tennessee at the time of its construction.

The Dunn Center features a 7,257-seat multi-purpose arena named the Dave Aaron Arena in 1988 in honor of the longtime Austin Peay athletic director and coach, Dave Aaron. In the fall of 2007, the basketball court was named the Dave Loos Court to honor the then athletic director and men's basketball coach Dave Loos. It hosted the Ohio Valley Conference men's basketball tournament in 1977.

The basketball teams originally planned to leave the Dunn Center after the 2021–22 season, moving to the new F&M Bank Arena in downtown Clarksville. However, construction delays put off the basketball teams' move until the 2023–24 season. Once the basketball teams move, the basketball arena will be reconfigured into a volleyball-specific facility.

The Dunn Center is often referred to as "The House That Fly Built", a reference to Austin Peay basketball great Fly Williams. It has also been called "The Big Red Barn," a reference to its predecessor gymnasium where Williams played (which had been built during the World War II era) that was known as the "Little Red Barn."

== Records ==
The Austin Peay men's basketball team earned their 350th victory in the building on December 30, 2013, as they defeated Dalton State College 93–57. With that victory, the men's basketball program owned a 350–144 record in the facility.

== See also ==
- List of NCAA Division I basketball arenas
