= Pete Mathews Coliseum =

Arena in Alabama, United States

- The Pete
- Interactive map of Pete Mathews Coliseum
- Location: 700 Pelham Road; Jacksonville, AL 36265
- Coordinates: 33.824°N 85.773°W
- Owner: Jacksonville State University
- Operator: Jacksonville State University
- Capacity: 3,500 (fall 2015 – present); 5,300 (1974 – Spring 2015)

Construction
- Opened: 1974
- Renovated: 2015

Tenants
- Jacksonville State Gamecocks (NCAA) (1974-present); AHSAA Northeast Regional Basketball Tournament; Calhoun County Basketball Tournament

Pete Mathews Coliseum (also known as "The Pete") is a 3,500-seat multi-purpose arena in Jacksonville, Alabama. It is home to the Jacksonville State University Gamecocks men's and women's basketball teams as well as the women's volleyball team. It also hosts the annual Calhoun County High School Basketball Tournament held each January, in which all high school basketball teams in Calhoun County, Alabama compete. The arena has been the annual host for this event since the early 1990s. Prior to that time, the event was held in different facilities around Calhoun County (most often at the Anniston High School auditorium). The venue opened in 1974 when the basketball team moved there from Stephenson Hall. In addition to the arena, the coliseum also houses an indoor swimming pool. Prior to the 2015 renovation, a concourse that was used as a jogging track circled the basketball court.

== Other information ==
The facility also includes classroom areas for HPER instruction and also has a large storage area on the lowest level beneath the classroom/swimming pool area.

The original seating capacity was 5,500 but due to several renovations since its construction has seen a slight decline in seating capacity to 5,300. Following renovations during the summer of 2015, the seating capacity declined to 3,500. Before that renovation, most of the seating was of the wooden bleacher variety (entire upper deck and end zone lower deck). The remaining seats were of red cloth seats with seat backs which were used primarily by season ticket holders. Those seats were replaced with plastic chair-back seating along both sides and permanent bleachers in both endzones. A new wooden floor was installed as well.

The arena currently hosts the Northeast Regional basketball tournament (boys and girls) for the AHSAA playoffs in each classification. The boys and girls winners go to Birmingham for the Final Four tournament.

The arena is named for the late former Alabama state legislator Pete Mathews who also sat on the university's board of trustees.

The original floor for the arena was synthetic rubber which was the popular flooring for basketball at the time. The arena was a multi-purpose facility when the synthetic rubber floor was in place. Women's volleyball, men's and women's basketball, intramural sports, HPER classes, graduation ceremonies, as well as various concerts and other events were held in the facility.

A wooden floor was installed in the early 1980s and the arena was reconfigured to be principally used for basketball. A renovation of the old Stephenson gymnasium allowed most of the activities that had been held in the arena besides men's and women's basketball and women's volleyball to be relocated there.

The university's baseball team formerly used the area behind the north side upper deck as a batting cage during winter workouts.

A large parking area borders the northern entrances to the facility while limited parking exists on the other three sides. The university's tennis complex borders the facility on the south side while an outdoor track, soccer and baseball facilities border it on the western side.

Among some of the performers who have held concerts in the facility include the group Alabama, Billy Joel, and Jimmy Buffett.

On March 19, 2018, Pete Mathews Coliseum suffered extensive roof damage after a tornado went through the Jacksonville State campus.

== See also ==
- List of NCAA Division I basketball arenas
