= Show Me Center =

Multi-purpose arena in Missouri

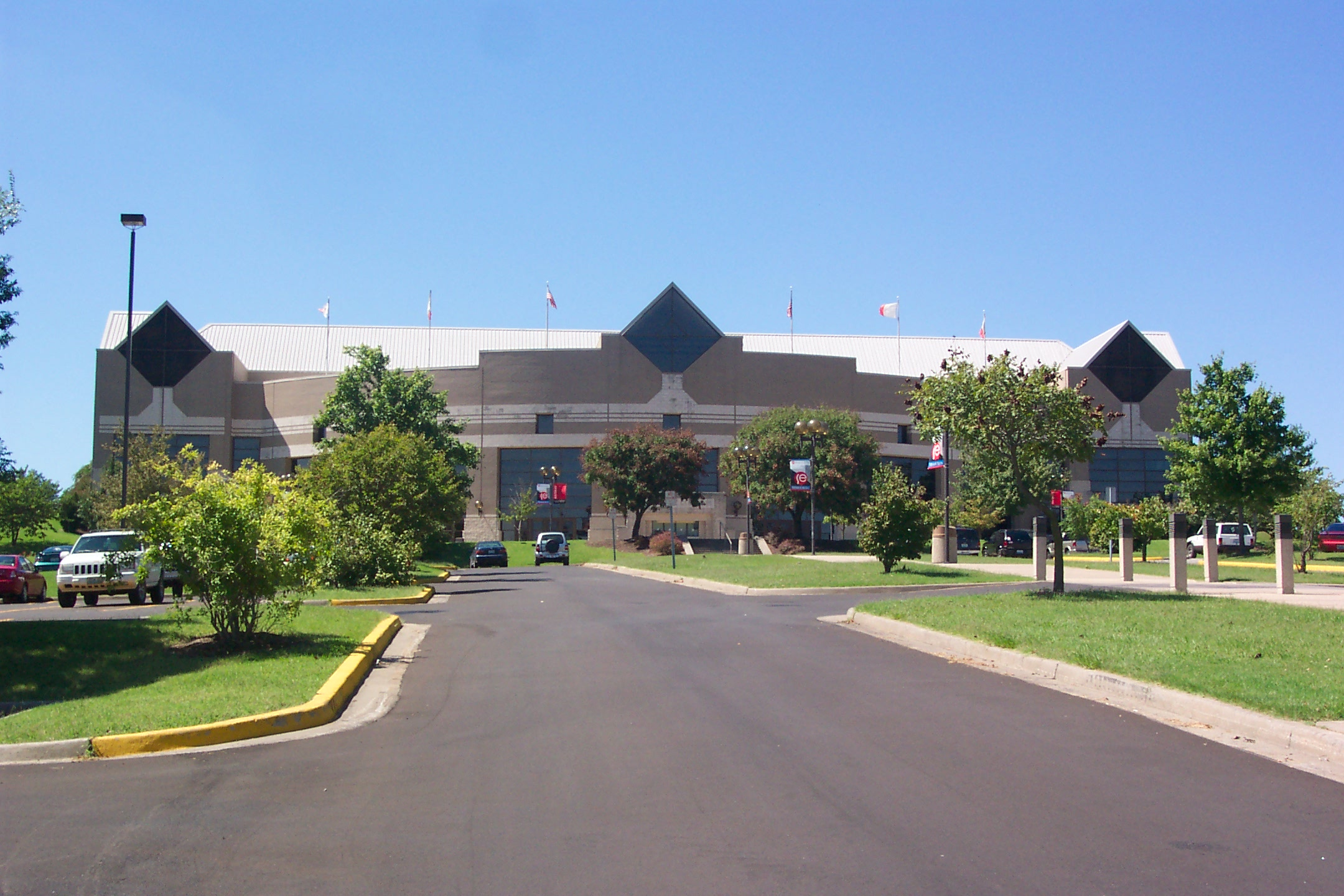
- Exterior view of the arena in 2006
- Interactive map of Show Me Center
- Address: 1333 North Sprigg Street; Cape Girardeau, MO; United States
- Coordinates: 37.32°N 89.5271°W
- Owner: Southeast Missouri State University
- Operator: SEMO Athletics
- Capacity: 7,373
- Type: Arena
- Surface: Multi-surface
- Current use: Basketball
- Public transit: Cape Girardeau Transit Authority

Construction
- Groundbreaking: 1985
- Opened: July 1987; 39 years ago
- Cost: $16.6 million ($47 million in 2025 dollars)
- Architect: Hastings+Chivetta

Tenants
- SEMO Redhawks teams: men's and women's basketball (1987–present)

Website
- semoredhawks.com/show-me-center

The Show Me Center is a multi-purpose arena, located on the campus of Southeast Missouri State University, in Cape Girardeau, Missouri.

Since its opening in 1987, this joint project between the City of Cape Girardeau and the university annually hosts approximately 250 meeting room and 160 arena events as an entertainment, meeting, and gathering center. It replaced Houck Field House as the primary home of Southeast Missouri State's athletics teams.

In 2015 the Show Me Center underwent a $5.62 million upgrade. The changes included: new scoreboards and shot clocks, a center-hung video display, new seating in the lower section, an improved audio system, and LED lighting above the court.

The arena is also the home of the NCAA Division I Southeast Missouri State University Redhawks basketball teams, and seats 7,373 for such events.

The Center hosted the 1991 NCAA Women's Division II Basketball Championship.

The Missouri State High School Activities Association has held its volleyball state championships at SEMO since 2011.

The arena has hosted several nationally televised professional wrestling events in its history, including the WWF in April 1988 and WCW in January 2000. A 2011 house show at the venue was mentioned in an episode of WWE Story Time on the WWE Network.

The Show Me Center has hosted many concerts in its history, including shows from Guns N' Roses, Aerosmith, Styx, REO Speedwagon, and Tina Turner.

== See also ==
- List of NCAA Division I basketball arenas
