= Groniger Arena =

Arena in Charleston, Illinois

- Interactive map of Groniger Arena
- Former names: Lantz Arena
- Location: 250 Grant Ave; Charleston, Illinois, United States 61920
- Coordinates: 39.480403°N 88.178844°W
- Owner: Eastern Illinois University
- Operator: Eastern Illinois University
- Capacity: 5,400

Construction
- Opened: 1967

Tenants
- Eastern Illinois Panthers men's basketball Eastern Illinois Panthers women's basketball

Groniger Arena at Charles P. Lantz Complex, formerly known as Lantz Arena, is a 5,400-seat multi-purpose arena in Charleston, Illinois. It is home to the Eastern Illinois University (EIU) Panthers men's and women's basketball teams. Completed in 1967, the Lantz Arena Complex also houses the offices of the EIU athletic department, the Lantz Indoor Fieldhouse, and the Ray Padovan Swimming Pool. The building replaced the Health Education Building (now known as McAfee Gymnasium), which was built in 1938 and is now on the National Register of Historic Places. The arena complex is named for Charles Lantz, longtime football, basketball, and baseball coach of the Panthers.

== See also ==
- List of NCAA Division I basketball arenas
