= 2018–19 Austin Peay Governors basketball team =

American college basketball season

2018–19 Austin Peay Governors men's basketball

St. Pete Shootout champion
- Conference: Ohio Valley Conference
- Record: 22–11 (13–5 OVC)
- Head coach: Matt Figger (2nd season)
- Assistant coaches: Rick Cabrera; Dalonte Hill; Sergio Rouco
- Home arena: Dunn Center

2018–19 Ohio Valley Conference men's basketball standings
	Conf.				Overall
Team	W		L	PCT	W		L	PCT
Belmont	16	–	2	.889	27	–	6	.818
Murray State†	16	–	2	.889	28	–	5	.848
Jacksonville State	15	–	3	.833	24	–	9	.727
Austin Peay	13	–	5	.722	22	–	11	.667
Morehead State	8	–	10	.444	13	–	20	.394
Eastern Illinois	7	–	11	.389	14	–	18	.438
UT Martin	6	–	12	.333	12	–	19	.387
SIU Edwardsville	6	–	12	.333	10	–	21	.323
Eastern Kentucky	6	–	12	.333	13	–	18	.419
Tennessee State	6	–	12	.333	9	–	21	.300
Southeast Missouri State	5	–	13	.278	10	–	21	.323
Tennessee Tech	4	–	14	.222	8	–	23	.258
† 2019 OVC tournament winner

The 2018–19 Austin Peay Governors men's basketball team represented Austin Peay State University during the 2018–19 NCAA Division I men's basketball season. The Governors, led by second-year head coach Matt Figger, played their home games at the Dunn Center in Clarksville, Tennessee as members of the Ohio Valley Conference. 22–11 overall, 13–5 in OVC play to finish in fourth place. In the OVC tournament, they defeated Morehead State in the quarterfinals before losing to Belmont in the semifinals.

== Previous season ==
The Governors finished the 2017–18 season 19–15, 12–6 in OVC play to finish in third place. They defeated Eastern Illinois in the quarterfinals of the OVC tournament before losing in the semifinals to Belmont. They were invited to the CollegeInsider.com Tournament where they defeated Louisiana–Monroe in the first round, a game referred to as the Coach John McLendon Classic, and received a second round bye before losing in the quarterfinals to UIC.

== Roster ==
2018–19 Austin Peay Governors men's basketball team
Players
Coaches

Pos.	#	Name	Height	Weight	Year	Hometown
G	0	Isaiah Hart	6 ft 2 in (1.88 m)	167 lb (76 kg)	Jr	Murfreesboro, Tennessee
G	1	Antwuan Butler	6 ft 0 in (1.83 m)	165 lb (75 kg)	Fr	Philadelphia, Pennsylvania
F	3	Chris Porter-Bunton	6 ft 5 in (1.96 m)	217 lb (98 kg)	RS Sr	Bowling Green, Kentucky
G	4	Dayton Gumm	6 ft 2 in (1.88 m)	172 lb (78 kg)	So	Bowling Green, Kentucky
G	10	Jerrett Givens	6 ft 5 in (1.96 m)	195 lb (88 kg)	Fr	Tempe, Arizona
G	14	Eli Abaev	6 ft 8 in (2.03 m)	210 lb (95 kg)	Jr	Deerfield Beach, Florida
F	15	Jabari McGhee	6 ft 7 in (2.01 m)	215 lb (98 kg)	Sr	Albany, Georgia
G	21	Terry Taylor	6 ft 5 in (1.96 m)	217 lb (98 kg)	So	Bowling Green, Kentucky
F	22	Richard Henderson	6 ft 6 in (1.98 m)	220 lb (100 kg)	So	Maryland Heights, Missouri
G/F	23	Steve Harris	6 ft 4 in (1.93 m)	180 lb (82 kg)	Sr	St. Louis, Missouri
C	24	Matheus Silveira	7 ft 0 in (2.13 m)	233 lb (106 kg)	So	Três Pontas, Brazil
G	25	Zach Glotta	6 ft 0 in (1.83 m)	185 lb (84 kg)	Sr	O'Fallon, Missouri
C	33	Ivan Cucak	7 ft 0 in (2.13 m)	235 lb (107 kg)	So	Kitchener, Ontario

Head coach

- Matt Figger (Eastern Kentucky)

Assistant coach(es)

- Rick Cabrera (Tennessee Tech)
- Dalonte Hill (UNC Charlotte)
- Sergio Rouco (Nova Southeastern)

Legend

- (C) Team captain
- (S) Suspended
- (I) Ineligible
- (W) Walk-on
- Injured
- Current redshirt

Roster
Last update: August 29, 2018

== Schedule and results ==
Date time, TV	Rank^{#}	Opponent^{#}	Result	Record	Site (attendance) city, state
Non-conference regular Season
Nov 6, 2018*; 7:00 pm, ESPN+		Oakland City	W 114–53	1–0	Dunn Center (1,373); Clarksville, TN
Nov 9, 2018*; 6:30 pm, SECN+		at No. 18 Mississippi State	L 67–95	1–1	Humphrey Coliseum (5,977); Starkville, MS
Nov 12, 2018*; 6:00 pm		at South Florida; Jamaica Classic campus game	L 70–74	1–2	Yuengling Center (2,474); Tampa, FL
Nov 16, 2018*; 11:30 am		vs. Central Connecticut; Jamaica Classic	W 80–78	2–2	Montego Bay Convention Center; Montego Bay, Jamaica
Nov 18, 2018*; 2:00 pm		vs. Campbell; Jamaica Classic	L 72–78	2–3	Montego Bay Convention Center; Montego Bay, Jamaica
Nov 24, 2018*; 2:00 pm		at Ohio	L 82–85 ^{OT}	2–4	Convocation Center (3,474); Athens, OH
Nov 29, 2018*; 7:15 pm		at Troy	W 79–74 ^{OT}	3–4	Trojan Arena (2,761); Troy, AL
Dec 1, 2018*; 6:00 pm		at Alabama A&M	W 73–61	4–4	Elmore Gymnasium (774); Huntsville, AL
Dec 8, 2018*; 4:00 pm, ESPN+		Calvary	W 116–33	5–4	Dunn Center (1,271); Clarksville, TN
Dec 15, 2018*; 4:00 pm, ESPN+		Purdue Fort Wayne	W 95–68	6–4	Dunn Center (1,344); Clarksville, TN
Dec 21, 2018*; 1:30 pm		vs. Campbell; St. Pete Shootout semifinals	W 88–75	7–4	McArthur Center (189); St. Petersburg, FL
Dec 22, 2018*; 2:30 pm		vs. Liberty; St. Pete Shootout finals	W 75–66	8–4	McArthur Center (202); St. Petersburg, FL
Dec 28, 2018*; 7:00 pm, SECN		at Arkansas	L 65–76	8–5	Bud Walton Arena (14,267); Fayetteville, AR
Ohio Valley Conference regular season
Jan 3, 2019; 8:00 pm, ESPN+		Eastern Kentucky	W 93–75	9–5 (1–0)	Dunn Center (1,393); Clarksville, TN
Jan 5, 2019; 4:00 pm, ESPN+		Morehead State	W 81–67	10–5 (2–0)	Dunn Center (1,552); Clarksville, TN
Jan 10, 2019; 7:45 pm, ESPN+		at Southeast Missouri State	W 78–60	11–5 (3–0)	Show Me Center (1,097); Cape Girardeau, MO
Jan 12, 2019; 3:30 pm, ESPN+		at UT Martin	W 72–70	12–5 (4–0)	Skyhawk Arena (1,481); Martin, TN
Jan 17, 2019; 7:30 pm, ESPN+		at SIU Edwardsville	W 79–71	13–5 (5–0)	Vadalabene Center (1,322); Edwardsville, IL
Jan 19, 2019; 3:15 pm, ESPN+		at Eastern Illinois	L 83–85	13–6 (5–1)	Lantz Arena (1,111); Charleston, IL
Jan 24, 2019; 8:00 pm, ESPN+		Tennessee State	W 89–74	14–6 (6–1)	Dunn Center (1,943); Clarksville, TN
Jan 26, 2019; 3:30 pm, ESPN+		Belmont	L 92–96	14–7 (6–2)	Dunn Center (2,215); Clarksville, TN
Jan 31, 2019; 6:00 pm, ESPNews		at Tennessee Tech	W 77–66	15–7 (7–2)	Eblen Center (1,997); Cookeville, TN
Feb 2, 2019; 4:00 pm, ESPN+		at Jacksonville State	W 74–71	16–7 (8–2)	Pete Mathews Coliseum (2,802); Jacksonville, AL
Feb 7, 2019; 8:00 pm, ESPN+		SIU Edwardsville	W 80–45	17–7 (9–2)	Dunn Center (1,479); Clarksville, TN
Feb 9, 2019; 4:00 pm, ESPN+		Eastern Illinois	W 94–86	18–7 (10–2)	Dunn Center (2,124); Clarksville, TN
Feb 14, 2019; 8:00 pm, ESPN2		Murray State	L 71–73	18–8 (10–3)	Dunn Center; Clarksville, TN
Feb 16, 2019; 3:30 pm, ESPN+		at Morehead State	W 73–70	19–8 (11–3)	Ellis Johnson Arena (2,282); Morehead, KY
Feb 21, 2019; ESPN+		Southeast Missouri State	W 83–70	20–8 (12–3)	Dunn Center (2,176); Clarksville, TN
Feb 23, 2019; ESPN+		UT Martin	W 92–78	21–8 (13–3)	Dunn Center; Clarksville, TN
Feb 28, 2019; 6:30 pm, ESPN+		at Eastern Kentucky	L 80–82	21–9 (13–4)	McBrayer Arena (1,640); Richmond, KY
Mar 2, 2019; 7:00 pm, ESPN+		at Murray State	L 83–94	21–10 (13–5)	CFSB Center (9,012); Murray, KY
Ohio Valley Conference tournament
Mar 6, 2019; 8:30 pm	(4)	vs. (5) Morehead State; Quarterfinals	W 95–81	22–10	Ford Center; Evansville, IN
Mar 7, 2019; 7:00 pm	(4)	vs. (1) Belmont; Semifinals	L 67–83	22–11	Ford Center; Evansville, IN
*Non-conference game. ^{#}Rankings from AP Poll. (#) Tournament seedings in parentheses. All times are in Central Time Source.
