= 2018–19 UT Martin Skyhawks men's basketball team =

American college basketball season

2018–19 UT Martin Skyhawks men's basketball
- Conference: Ohio Valley Conference
- West Division
- Record: 12–19 (6–12 OVC)
- Head coach: Anthony Stewart (3rd season)
- Assistant coaches: DeAndre Walker (5th season); Zach Carpenter (2nd season)
- Home arena: Skyhawk Arena

2018–19 Ohio Valley Conference men's basketball standings
	Conf.				Overall
Team	W		L	PCT	W		L	PCT
Belmont	16	–	2	.889	27	–	6	.818
Murray State†	16	–	2	.889	28	–	5	.848
Jacksonville State	15	–	3	.833	24	–	9	.727
Austin Peay	13	–	5	.722	22	–	11	.667
Morehead State	8	–	10	.444	13	–	20	.394
Eastern Illinois	7	–	11	.389	14	–	18	.438
UT Martin	6	–	12	.333	12	–	19	.387
SIU Edwardsville	6	–	12	.333	10	–	21	.323
Eastern Kentucky	6	–	12	.333	13	–	18	.419
Tennessee State	6	–	12	.333	9	–	21	.300
Southeast Missouri State	5	–	13	.278	10	–	21	.323
Tennessee Tech	4	–	14	.222	8	–	23	.258
† 2019 OVC tournament winner

The 2018–19 UT Martin Skyhawks men's basketball team represented the University of Tennessee at Martin during the 2018–19 NCAA Division I men's basketball season. The Skyhawks, led by third-year head coach Anthony Stewart, played their home games at Skyhawk Arena as members of the Ohio Valley Conference. They finished the season 12–19, 6–12 in OVC play to finish in a four-way tie for seventh place. As the No. 7 seed in the OVC tournament they defeated Eastern Illinois in the first round before losing in the quarterfinals to Jacksonville State.

== Previous season ==
The Skyhawks finished the 2017–18 season 10–21, 5–13 in OVC play to finish in a three-way tie for ninth place. They failed to qualify for the OVC tournament.

== Roster ==
2018–19 UT Martin Skyhawks men's basketball team
Players
Coaches

Pos.	#	Name	Height	Weight	Year	Previous school	Hometown
G	0	Preston Parks	6 ft 1 in (1.85 m)	190 lb (86 kg)	Jr	The Citadel	Greenville, South Carolina
G	1	Craig Randall II	6 ft 4 in (1.93 m)	185 lb (84 kg)	RS Jr	Duquesne	Youngstown, Ohio
G	2	Charles Henderson	6 ft 4 in (1.93 m)	210 lb (95 kg)	Jr	Trinidad State JC	Houston, Texas
G	3	Kevin Little	6 ft 0 in (1.83 m)	170 lb (77 kg)	RS Sr	Colorado State	Wyandanch, New York
G	4	Parrish Hewitt	6 ft 3 in (1.91 m)	185 lb (84 kg)	So	Douglass HS	Memphis, Tennessee
G	5	Derek Hawthorne, Jr.	6 ft 3 in (1.91 m)	210 lb (95 kg)	Jr	John A. Logan CC	Indianapolis, Indiana
G	11	Delfincko Bogan	5 ft 10 in (1.78 m)	190 lb (86 kg)	Sr	Moberly Area CC	Charleston, Missouri
F	12	Fatodd Lewis	6 ft 8 in (2.03 m)	230 lb (104 kg)	RS Sr	Raleigh-Egypt HS	Memphis, Tennessee
F	22	Quintin Dove	6 ft 8 in (2.03 m)	200 lb (91 kg)	Jr	Cuyahoga CC	Cleveland, Ohio
F	30	Jailen Gill	6 ft 8 in (2.03 m)	235 lb (107 kg)	Sr	Antelope Valley CC	Kansas City, Missouri
G	34	Trenten Williams	6 ft 3 in (1.91 m)	175 lb (79 kg)	Jr	Gillette CC	Houston, Texas
F	35	Minfeke Sanoe	6 ft 10 in (2.08 m)	250 lb (113 kg)	So	Mt. San Antonio CC	Philadelphia, Pennsylvania
F	42	Jeremy Joyner	6 ft 9 in (2.06 m)	215 lb (98 kg)	Jr	Roane State CC	Riverdale, Georgia
G		Parker Stewart	6 ft 5 in (1.96 m)	205 lb (93 kg)	So	Pittsburgh	Union City, Tennessee

Head coach

- Anthony Stewart (Mount Union)

Assistant coach(es)

- DeAndre Walker (Fairmont State)
- Zack Carpenter (Lee)

Legend

- (C) Team captain
- (S) Suspended
- (I) Ineligible
- (W) Walk-on
- Injured
- Current redshirt

Roster

== Schedule and results ==
Date time, TV	Rank^{#}	Opponent^{#}	Result	Record	Site (attendance) city, state
Exhibition
Nov 1, 2018*; 7:30 pm		St. Louis College of Pharmacy	W 113–47		Skyhawk Arena; Martin, TN
Non–conference regular season
Nov 6, 2018*; 7:30 pm, ESPN+		Cumberland	W 91–58	1–0	Skyhawk Arena (1,564); Martin, TN
Nov 10, 2018*; 6:00 pm, ESPN3		at Western Kentucky	L 71–86	1–1	E. A. Diddle Arena (5,815); Bowling Green, KY
Nov 16, 2018*; 6:00 pm, ESPN3		at Mercer	L 60–77	1–2	Hawkins Arena (2,705); Macon, GA
Nov 21, 2018*; 3:30 pm		Western Illinois	W 92–90	2–2	Skyhawk Arena (1,005); Martin, TN
Dec 1, 2018*; 7:30 pm, ESPN+		UNC Asheville	W 87–70	3–2	Skyhawk Arena (1,669); Martin, TN
Dec 5, 2018*; 7:00 pm		at Tulane	L 74–87	3–3	Devlin Fieldhouse (943); New Orleans, LA
Dec 8, 2018*; 3:00 pm, ESPN+		at East Tennessee State	L 60–82	3–4	Freedom Hall Civic Center (4,210); Johnson City, TN
Dec 15, 2018*; 7:30 pm, ESPN+		Brescia	W 108–79	4–4	Skyhawk Arena (1,061); Martin, TN
Dec 18, 2018*; 7:30 pm, ESPN+		Chattanooga	W 108–79	5–4	Skyhawk Arena (1,054); Martin, TN
Dec 22, 2018*; 6:00 pm, MWN		at Fresno State	L 53–93	5–5	Save Mart Center (4,988); Fresno, CA
Dec 30, 2018*; 1:30 pm		at Bowling Green	L 80–94	5–6	Stroh Center; Bowling Green, OH
Ohio Valley Conference regular season
Jan 3, 2019; 7:30 pm, ESPN+		at Eastern Illinois	L 87-92 ^{OT}	5–7 (0–1)	Lantz Arena (1,072); Charleston, IL
Jan 5, 2019; 4:30 pm, ESPN+		at Southeast Missouri	L 69–74 ^{OT}	5–8 (0–2)	Show Me Center (746); Cape Girardeau, MO
Jan 10, 2019; 7:30 pm, ESPN+		Murray State	L 77–98	5–9 (0–3)	Skyhawk Arena (3,114); Martin, TN
Jan 12, 2019; 3:30 pm, ESPN+		Austin Peay	L 70–72	5–10 (0–4)	Skyhawk Arena (1,481); Martin, TN
Jan 17, 2019; 6:00 pm, ESPN+		at Eastern Kentucky	L 73–97	5–11 (0–5)	McBrayer Arena (1,803); Richmond, KY
Jan 19, 2019; 5:30 pm, ESPN3		at Morehead State	L 77-85	5–12 (0–6)	Ellis Johnson Arena (2,234); Morehead, KY
Jan 24, 2019; 7:30 pm, ESPN+		Eastern Illinois	L 64–66	5–13 (0–7)	Skyhawk Arena (1,094); Martin, TN
Jan 26, 2019; 3:30 pm, ESPN+		SIU Edwardsville	W 85–69	6–13 (1–7)	Skyhawk Arena (1,031); Martin, TN
Jan 31, 2019; 7:30 pm, ESPN+		at Tennessee State	L 67–68	6–14 (1–8)	Gentry Complex (1,025); Nashville, TN
Feb 2, 2019; 5:00 pm, ESPN+		at Belmont	L 67–82	6–15 (1–9)	Curb Event Center (2,478); Nashville, TN
Feb 7, 2019; 7:30 pm, ESPN+		Jacksonville State	W 66–64	7–15 (2–9)	Skyhawk Arena (942); Martin, TN
Feb 9, 2019; 3:30 pm, ESPN+		Tennessee Tech	W 77–58	8–15 (3–9)	Skyhawk Arena (1,717); Martin, TN
Feb 14, 2019; 7:30 pm, ESPN+		Southeast Missouri	W 81–72	9–15 (4–9)	Skyhawk Arena (1,034); Martin, TN
Feb 16, 2019; 2:00 pm, ESPN3		at SIU Edwardsville	W 73–69	10–15 (5–9)	Vadalabene Center (1,011); Edwardsville, IL
Feb 21, 2019; 7:00 pm, ESPN+		at Murray State	L 75–85	10–16 (5–10)	CFSB Center (5,175); Murray, KY
Feb 23, 2019; 4:00 pm, ESPN+		at Austin Peay	L 78–92	10–17 (5–11)	Dunn Center (2,233); Clarksville, TN
Feb 28, 2019; 7:30 pm, ESPN+		Belmont	L 67–112	10–18 (5–12)	Skyhawk Arena (1,316); Martin, TN
Mar 2, 2019; 3:30 pm, ESPN+		Tennessee State	W 91–86	11–18 (6–12)	Skyhawk Arena (1,291); Martin, TN
Ohio Valley Conference tournament
Mar 6, 2019; 8:30 pm, ESPN+	(7)	vs. (6) Eastern Illinois; First round	W 78–71	12–18	Ford Center (643); Evansville, IN
Mar 6, 2019; 8:30 pm, ESPN+	(7)	vs. (3) Jacksonville State; Quarterfinals	L 81–95	12–19	Ford Center; Evansville, IN
*Non-conference game. ^{#}Rankings from AP Poll. (#) Tournament seedings in parentheses. All times are in Central Time.
