= 2018–19 Murray State Racers men's basketball team =

American college basketball season

2018–19 Murray State Racers men's basketball
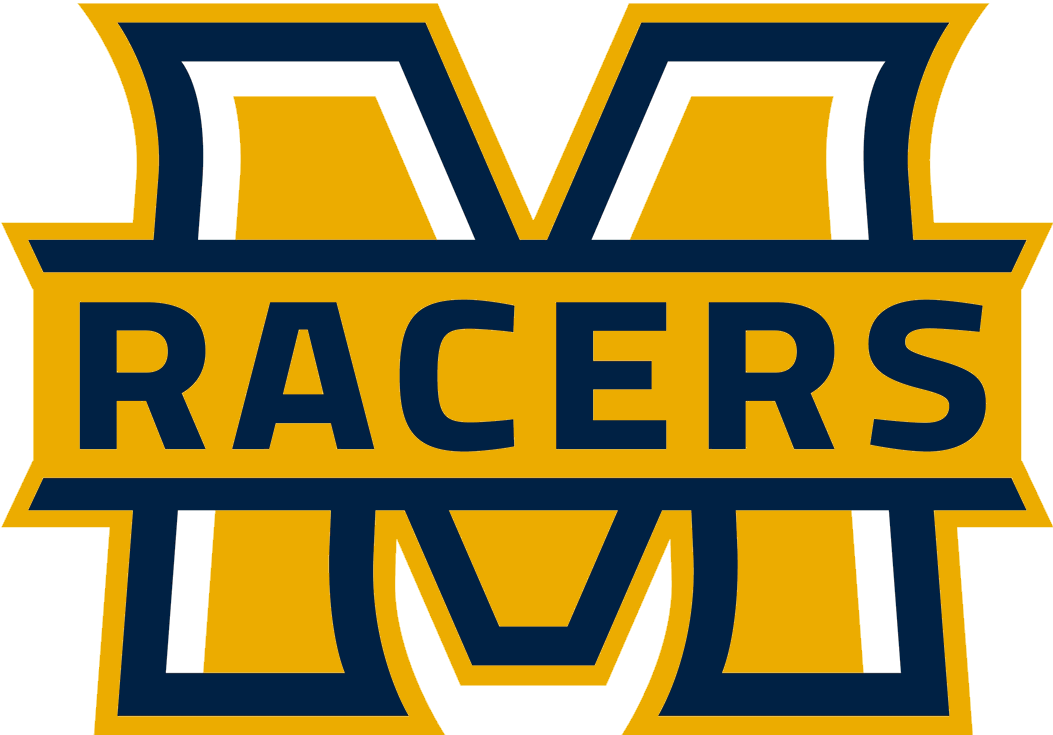

Ohio Valley regular season co-champions OVC Tournament champions

NCAA tournament, Second Round
- Conference: Ohio Valley Conference
- Record: 28–5 (16–2 OVC)
- Head coach: Matt McMahon (4th season)
- Assistant coaches: Shane Nichols; Tim Kaine; Casey Long
- Home arena: CFSB Center

2018–19 Ohio Valley Conference men's basketball standings
	Conf.				Overall
Team	W		L	PCT	W		L	PCT
Belmont	16	–	2	.889	27	–	6	.818
Murray State†	16	–	2	.889	28	–	5	.848
Jacksonville State	15	–	3	.833	24	–	9	.727
Austin Peay	13	–	5	.722	22	–	11	.667
Morehead State	8	–	10	.444	13	–	20	.394
Eastern Illinois	7	–	11	.389	14	–	18	.438
UT Martin	6	–	12	.333	12	–	19	.387
SIU Edwardsville	6	–	12	.333	10	–	21	.323
Eastern Kentucky	6	–	12	.333	13	–	18	.419
Tennessee State	6	–	12	.333	9	–	21	.300
Southeast Missouri State	5	–	13	.278	10	–	21	.323
Tennessee Tech	4	–	14	.222	8	–	23	.258
† 2019 OVC tournament winner

The 2018–19 Murray State Racers men's basketball team represented Murray State University during the 2018–19 NCAA Division I men's basketball season. The Racers, led by fourth-year head coach Matt McMahon, played their home games at the CFSB Center in Murray, Kentucky as members of the Ohio Valley Conference. They finished the season 28–5, 16–2 in OVC play to finish second to Belmont on a tiebreaker for the regular season championship with Belmont. They defeated Jacksonville State and upset the short-handed Belmont Bruins to be champions of the OVC tournament. They earned the OVC's automatic-bid to the NCAA tournament where they defeated Marquette in the first round before losing in the second round to Florida State.

== Previous season ==
The Racers finished the 2017–18 season 26–6, 16–2 in OVC play to win the OVC regular season championship. They defeated Jacksonville State and Belmont to become champions of the OVC tournament. They earned the OVC's automatic bid to the NCAA tournament where they lost in the first round to West Virginia.

== Roster ==
2018–19 Murray State Racers men's basketball team
Players
Coaches

Pos.	#	Name	Height	Weight	Year	Previous school	Hometown
F	0	Mike Davis	6 ft 7 in (2.01 m)	210 lb (95 kg)	Jr	W. S. Neal HS; Coastal Alabama CC	East Brewton, AL
G	1	DaQuan Smith (injured) (redshirt)	6 ft 1 in (1.85 m)	175 lb (79 kg)	Fr	Holly Springs HS	Holly Springs, MS
F	4	Brion Sanchious	6 ft 8 in (2.03 m)	245 lb (111 kg)	Sr	Northeast HS	Pompano Beach, FL
G	10	Tevin Brown	6 ft 5 in (1.96 m)	180 lb (82 kg)	RS Fr	Fairhope HS	Fairhope, AL
G	11	Shaq Buchanan	6 ft 3 in (1.91 m)	190 lb (86 kg)	Sr	Madison Central HS; NE Miss CC	Madison, MS
G	12	Ja Morant	6 ft 3 in (1.91 m)	175 lb (79 kg)	So	Crestwood HS	Dalzell, SC
F	13	Devin Gilmore	6 ft 6 in (1.98 m)	200 lb (91 kg)	So	Madison-Ridgeland Academy	Picayune, MS
G	14	Jaiveon Eaves	6 ft 2 in (1.88 m)	195 lb (88 kg)	Jr	Madisonville North Hopkins HS	Madisonville, KY
G	22	Brion Whitley	6 ft 4 in (1.93 m)	200 lb (91 kg)	So	Riverview HS	Sarasota, FL
F	23	KJ Williams	6 ft 9 in (2.06 m)	240 lb (109 kg)	Fr	Cleveland Central HS	Cleveland, MS
F	24	Anthony Smith (injured) (redshirt)	6 ft 7 in (2.01 m)	225 lb (102 kg)	Sr	Potomac HS; Barton CC	Suitland, MD
G	25	Jalen Johnson	6 ft 1 in (1.85 m)	175 lb (79 kg)	Fr	Hopkinsville HS	Hopkinsville, KY
F	32	Darnell Cowart	6 ft 8 in (2.03 m)	295 lb (134 kg)	Jr	Agua Fria HS; Cowley CC	Chicago, IL

Head coach

- Matt McMahon (Appalachian State)

Assistant coach(es)

- Shane Nichols (Wofford)
- Tim Kaine (Winthrop)
- Casey Long (Chattanooga)

Legend

- (C) Team captain
- (S) Suspended
- (I) Ineligible
- (W) Walk-on
- Injured
- Current redshirt

Roster
Last update: August 30, 2018

== Schedule and results ==
Date time, TV	Rank^{#}	Opponent^{#}	Result	Record	Site (attendance) city, state
Exhibition
Nov 5, 2018*; 7:00 pm, ESPN+		Brescia	W 99–61		CFSB Center (2,912); Murray, KY
Non-conference regular season
Nov 10, 2018*; 7:00 pm, ESPN+		Wright State	W 73–54	1–0	CFSB Center (5,066); Murray, KY
Nov 16, 2018*; 7:00 pm, ESPN+		Spalding	W 106–36	2–0	CFSB Center (2,748); Murray, KY
Nov 24, 2018*; 7:00 pm, ESPN+		Missouri State	W 77–66	3–0	CFSB Center (2,701); Murray, KY
Nov 26, 2018*; 7:00 pm, SECN+		at Alabama	L 72–78	3–1	Coleman Coliseum (9,004); Tuscaloosa, AL
Dec 1, 2018*; 7:00 pm, ESPN+		Prairie View A&M	W 83–67	4–1	CFSB Center (3,485); Murray, KY
Dec 8, 2018*; 7:00 pm, ESPN+		at Middle Tennessee	W 64–42	5–1	Murphy Center (4,102); Murfreesboro, TN
Dec 12, 2018*; 7:00 pm, ESPN+		at Southern Illinois	W 80–52	6–1	SIU Arena (5,107); Crabondale, IL
Dec 15, 2018*; 7:00 pm, ESPN+		Jackson State	W 74–57	7–1	CFSB Center (3,612); Murray, KY
Dec 18, 2018*; 7:00 pm, ESPN+		Evansville	W 66–64	8–1	CFSB Center (4,099); Murray, KY
Dec 22, 2018*; 3:30 pm, SECN		at No. 7 Auburn	L 88–93	8–2	Auburn Arena (8,356); Auburn, AL
Dec 29, 2018*; 7:00 pm, ESPN+		Bethel (TN)	W 110–82	9–2	CFSB Center (3,703); Murray, KY
Ohio Valley Conference regular season
Jan 3, 2019; 7:00 pm, ESPN+		Morehead State	W 90–69	10–2 (1–0)	CFSB Center (4,006); Murray, KY
Jan 5, 2019; 7:00 pm, ESPN+		Eastern Kentucky	W 97–85	11–2 (2–0)	CFSB Center (6,552); Murray, KY
Jan 10, 2019; 7:30 pm, ESPN+		at UT Martin	W 98–77	12–2 (3–0)	Skyhawk Arena (3,114); Martin, TN
Jan 12, 2019; 4:15 pm, ESPN+		at Southeast Missouri State	W 85–67	13–2 (4–0)	Show Me Center (3,143); Cape Girardeau, MO
Jan 17, 2019; 7:15 pm, ESPN+		at Eastern Illinois	W 83–61	14–2 (5–0)	Lantz Arena (2,410); Charleston, IL
Jan 19, 2019; 7:00 pm, ESPN+		at SIU Edwardsville	W 82–72	15–2 (6–0)	Vadalabene Center (2,178); Edwardsville, IL
Jan 24, 2019; 8:00 pm, ESPNU		Belmont	L 66–79	15–3 (6–1)	CFSB Center (8,969); Murray, KY
Jan 26, 2019; 7:00 pm, ESPN+		Tennessee State	W 100–62	16–3 (7–1)	CFSB Center (7,059); Murray, KY
Jan 31, 2019; 7:15 pm, ESPN+		at Jacksonville State	L 68–88	16–4 (7–2)	Pete Mathews Coliseum (3,718); Jacksonville, AL
Feb 2, 2019; 7:30 pm, ESPN+		at Tennessee Tech	W 67–63	17–4 (8–2)	Eblen Center (5,250); Cookeville, TN
Feb 7, 2019; 7:00 pm, ESPN+		Eastern Illinois	W 86–75	18–4 (9–2)	CFSB Center (5,111); Murray, KY
Feb 9, 2019; 7:00 pm, ESPN+		SIU Edwardsville	W 86-55	19-4 (10-2)	CFSB Center (8,007); Murray, KY
Feb 14, 2019; 8:00 pm, ESPN2		at Austin Peay	W 73–71	20–4 (11–2)	Dunn Center (4,864); Clarksville, TN
Feb 16, 2019; 6:00 pm, ESPN+		at Eastern Kentucky	W 102–70	21–4 (12–2)	McBrayer Arena (5,640); Richmond, KY
Feb 21, 2019; 7:00 pm, ESPN+		UT Martin	W 85–75	22–4 (13–2)	CFSB Center (5,175); Murray, KY
Feb 23, 2019; 7:00 pm, ESPN+		Southeast Missouri State	W 103–67	23–4 (14–2)	CFSB Center (7,762); Murray, KY
Feb 28, 2019; 6:30 pm, ESPN+		at Morehead State	W 71–52	24–4 (15–2)	Ellis Johnson Arena (6,071); Morehead, KY
Mar 2, 2019; 7:00 pm, ESPN+		Austin Peay	W 94–83	25–4 (16–2)	CFSB Center (9,012); Murray, KY
Ohio Valley Conference tournament
Mar 8, 2019; 10:00 pm, ESPNU	(2)	vs. (3) Jacksonville State; Semifinals	W 76–74	26–4	Ford Center (8,294); Evansville, IN
Mar 9, 2019; 7:00 pm, ESPN2	(2)	vs. (1) Belmont; Championship	W 77–65	27–4	Ford Center (10,525); Evansville, IN
NCAA tournament
Mar 21, 2019*; 3:30 pm, TBS	(12 W)	vs. (5 W) Marquette; First Round	W 83–64	28–4	XL Center (14,838); Hartford, CT
Mar 23, 2019*; 5:10 pm, TNT	(12 W)	vs. (4 W) No. 10 Florida State; Second Round	L 62–90	28–5	XL Center (15,031); Hartford, CT
*Non-conference game. ^{#}Rankings from AP Poll. (#) Tournament seedings in parentheses. W=West Source. All times are in Central Time.
