= 2018–19 Tennessee Tech Golden Eagles men's basketball team =

American college basketball season

2018–19 Tennessee Tech Golden Eagles men's basketball
- Conference: Ohio Valley Conference
- East Division
- Record: 8–23 (4–14 OVC)
- Head coach: Steve Payne (8th season)
- Assistant coaches: Jason Taylor; Gus Fraley; Gerald Gillion
- Home arena: Eblen Center

2018–19 Ohio Valley Conference men's basketball standings
	Conf.				Overall
Team	W		L	PCT	W		L	PCT
Belmont	16	–	2	.889	27	–	6	.818
Murray State†	16	–	2	.889	28	–	5	.848
Jacksonville State	15	–	3	.833	24	–	9	.727
Austin Peay	13	–	5	.722	22	–	11	.667
Morehead State	8	–	10	.444	13	–	20	.394
Eastern Illinois	7	–	11	.389	14	–	18	.438
UT Martin	6	–	12	.333	12	–	19	.387
SIU Edwardsville	6	–	12	.333	10	–	21	.323
Eastern Kentucky	6	–	12	.333	13	–	18	.419
Tennessee State	6	–	12	.333	9	–	21	.300
Southeast Missouri State	5	–	13	.278	10	–	21	.323
Tennessee Tech	4	–	14	.222	8	–	23	.258
† 2019 OVC tournament winner

The 2018–19 Tennessee Tech Golden Eagles men's basketball team represented Tennessee Technological University during the 2018–19 NCAA Division I men's basketball season. The Golden Eagles, led by eighth-year head coach Steve Payne, played their home games at the Eblen Center in Cookeville, Tennessee as members of the Ohio Valley Conference. They finished the season 8–23 overall, 4–14 in OVC play to finish in last place and missed the conference tournament.

On March 3, 2019, the school announced that Payne had resigned after eight seasons as Tennessee Tech head coach.

== Previous season ==
The Eagles finished the season 19–14, 10–8 in OVC play to finish in a tie for fifth place. They defeated SIU Edwardsville in the first round of the OVC tournament to advance to the quarterfinals, where they lost to Jacksonville State.

== Roster ==
2018–19 Tennessee Tech Golden Eagles men's basketball team
Players
Coaches

Pos.	#	Name	Height	Weight	Year	Hometown
G	0	Chris McNeal	6 ft 1 in (1.85 m)	185 lb (84 kg)	Sr	Jackson, Tennessee
G	1	Maverick Smith	6 ft 5 in (1.96 m)	185 lb (84 kg)	So	Oakdale, Tennessee
G	2	Jared Sherfield	6 ft 5 in (1.96 m)	160 lb (73 kg)	Fr	Tuscaloosa, Alabama
G	3	Corey Tillery	6 ft 1 in (1.85 m)	165 lb (75 kg)	Jr	Atlanta, GA
G	4	JR Clay	6 ft 0 in (1.83 m)	160 lb (73 kg)	Fr	Chattanooga, Tennessee
F	5	Johnnie Vassar	6 ft 1 in (1.85 m)	185 lb (84 kg)	Sr	Chicago, Illinois
G	10	Chase Ridenour	6 ft 0 in (1.83 m)	190 lb (86 kg)	Fr	Knoxville, Tennessee
C	11	Micaiah Henry	6 ft 9 in (2.06 m)	235 lb (107 kg)	RS Jr	Decatur, Georgia
G	15	Tyler Thompson	6 ft 5 in (1.96 m)	205 lb (93 kg)	Jr	Kingston, Tennessee
G	20	Hunter Vick	6 ft 4 in (1.93 m)	170 lb (77 kg)	RS Fr	Camden, Tennessee
C	21	Reece Wilkinson	6 ft 8 in (2.03 m)	225 lb (102 kg)	Fr	Miami, Florida
F	22	Courtney Alexander II	6 ft 7 in (2.01 m)	205 lb (93 kg)	Sr	Mableton, Georgia
G	23	Caden Mills	6 ft 6 in (1.98 m)	190 lb (86 kg)	Fr	Spencer, Tennessee
F	24	Garrett Golday	6 ft 7 in (2.01 m)	215 lb (98 kg)	Fr	Arlington, Tennessee
F	25	Malik Martin	6 ft 11 in (2.11 m)	214 lb (97 kg)	Sr	Miami, Florida
G	30	Spencer Chandler	6 ft 5 in (1.96 m)	180 lb (82 kg)	Fr	Clinton, Tennessee
G	54	Cade Crosland	6 ft 0 in (1.83 m)	180 lb (82 kg)	Jr	Sparta, Tennessee

Head coach

- Steve Payne (Union Commonwealth)

Assistant coach(es)

- Jason Taylor (Jacksonville State)
- Gus Fraley (North Carolina)
- Gerald Gillion (Florida State)

Legend

- (C) Team captain
- (S) Suspended
- (I) Ineligible
- (W) Walk-on
- Injured
- Current redshirt

Roster
Last update: October 4, 2018

== Schedule and results ==
Date time, TV	Rank^{#}	Opponent^{#}	Result	Record	Site (attendance) city, state
Non-conference regular season
Nov 6, 2018*; 7:00 pm, ESPN3		at Memphis	L 61–76	0–1	FedExForum (15,231); Memphis, TN
Nov 10, 2018*; 6:00 pm, ESPN+		Presbyterian; Las Vegas Invitational	L 65–80	0–2	Eblen Center (1,183); Cookeville, TN
Nov 13, 2018*; 6:00 pm		at Savannah State	L 83–97	0–3	Tiger Arena (1,029); Savannah, GA
Nov 16, 2018*; 6:00 pm, ACCN Extra		at No. 7 North Carolina; Las Vegas Invitational	L 58–108	0–4	Dean Smith Center (20,816); Chapel Hill, NC
Nov 18, 2018*; 5:00 pm, BTN		at No. 11 Michigan State; Las Vegas Invitational	L 33–101	0–5	Breslin Student Events Center (14,797); East Lansing, MI
Nov 23, 2018*; 6:00 pm, ESPN+		Louisiana–Monroe; Las Vegas Invitational	W 79–73	1–5	Eblen Center (896); Cookeville, TN
Nov 28, 2018*; 6:00 pm, ESPN+		Winthrop	L 70–82	1–6	Eblen Center (980); Cookeville, TN
Dec 1, 2018*; 1:00 pm, ESPN+		at Chattanooga	L 60–71	1–7	McKenzie Arena (2,398); Chattanooga, TN
Dec 6, 2018*; 6:00 pm, ESPN+		Warren Wilson	W 118–60	2–7	Eblen Center (811); Cookeville, TN
Dec 9, 2018*; 2:00 pm, ESPN+		Hiwassee	W 97–60	3–7	Eblen Center (840); Cookeville, TN
Dec 15, 2018*; 3:00 pm, ESPN+		at Kennesaw State	L 68–73	3–8	KSU Convocation Center (1,203); Kennesaw, GA
Dec 20, 2018*; 6:00 pm, ESPN+		Savannah State	W 91–80	4–8	Eblen Center (807); Cookeville, TN
Dec 29, 2018*; 3:00 pm, SECN		at No. 3 Tennessee	L 53–96	4–9	Thompson–Boling Arena (21,165); Knoxville, TN
Ohio Valley Conference regular season
Jan 3, 2019; 7:30 pm, ESPN+		at Tennessee State	W 66–64	5–9 (1–0)	Gentry Complex (632); Nashville, TN
Jan 5, 2019; 5:00 pm, ESPN+		at Belmont	L 67–79	5–10 (1–1)	Curb Event Center (2,385); Nashville, TN
Jan 10, 2019; 7:30 pm, ESPN+		SIU Edwardsville	W 78–69 ^{OT}	6–10 (2–1)	Eblen Center (1,674); Cookeville, TN
Jan 12, 2019; 7:30 pm, ESPN+		Eastern Illinois	L 60–67	6–11 (2–2)	Eblen Center (3,079); Cookeville, TN
Jan 17, 2019; 6:00 pm, ESPNU		Tennessee State	L 62–79	6–12 (2–3)	Eblen Center (1,276); Cookeville, TN
Jan 19, 2019; 7:00 pm, ESPN+		at Jacksonville State	L 48–65	6–13 (2–4)	Pete Mathews Coliseum (1,019); Jacksonville, AL
Jan 24, 2019; 6:30 pm, ESPN+		at Morehead State	L 61–67	6–14 (2–5)	Ellis Johnson Arena (2,088); Morehead, KY
Jan 26, 2019; 6:00 pm, ESPN+		at Eastern Kentucky	W 91–85	7–14 (3–5)	Davis-Reid Alumni Gym (1,410); Georgetown, KY
Jan 31, 2019; 6:00 pm, ESPNews		Austin Peay	L 66–77	7–15 (3–6)	Eblen Center (1,997); Cookeville, TN
Feb 2, 2019; 7:30 pm, ESPN+		Murray State	L 63–67	7–16 (3–7)	Eblen Center (5,250); Cookeville, TN
Feb 7, 2019; 7:30 pm, ESPN+		at Southeast Missouri State	L 66–71 ^{OT}	7–17 (3–8)	Show Me Center (1,635); Cape Girardeau, MO
Feb 9, 2019; 3:30 pm, ESPN+		at UT Martin	L 58–77	7–18 (3–9)	Skyhawk Arena (1,717); Martin, TN
Feb 14, 2019; 7:30 pm, ESPN+		Jacksonville State	L 57–67	7–19 (3–10)	Eblen Center (1,159); Cookeville, TN
Feb 16, 2019; 7:30 pm, ESPN+		Belmont	L 65–93	7–20 (3–11)	Eblen Center (2,625); Cookeville, TN
Feb 21, 2019; 7:30 pm, ESPN+		Eastern Kentucky	L 66–67	7–21 (3–12)	Eblen Center (1,536); Cookeville, TN
Feb 23, 2019; 7:30 pm, ESPN+		Morehead State	L 63–66	7–22 (3–13)	Eblen Center (1,949); Cookeville, TN
Feb 28, 2019; 7:30 pm, ESPN+		at SIU Edwardsville	L 68–76	7–23 (3–14)	Vadalabene Center (1,350); Edwardsville, IL
Mar 2, 2019; 3:15 pm, ESPN+		at Eastern Illinois	W 63–57	8–23 (4–14)	Lantz Arena (1,046); Charleston, IL
*Non-conference game. (#) Tournament seedings in parentheses. All times are in Central Time.
