= 2018–19 Southeast Missouri State Redhawks men's basketball team =

American college basketball season

2018–19 Southeast Missouri State Redhawks men's basketball
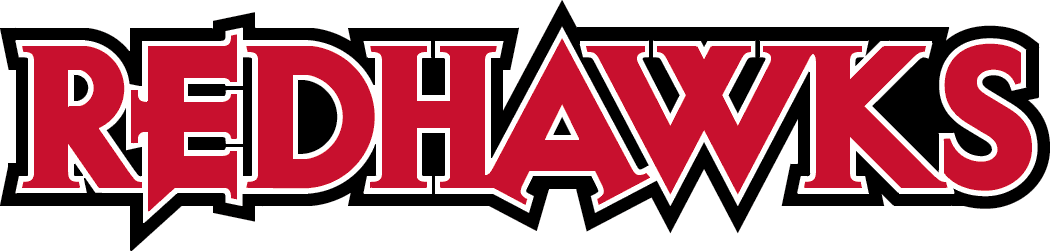
- Conference: Ohio Valley Conference
- Record: 10–21 (5–13 OVC)
- Head coach: Rick Ray (4th season)
- Assistant coaches: Adam Gordon; Nick Lagroone; Keith Pickens
- Home arena: Show Me Center

2018–19 Ohio Valley Conference men's basketball standings
	Conf.				Overall
Team	W		L	PCT	W		L	PCT
Belmont	16	–	2	.889	27	–	6	.818
Murray State†	16	–	2	.889	28	–	5	.848
Jacksonville State	15	–	3	.833	24	–	9	.727
Austin Peay	13	–	5	.722	22	–	11	.667
Morehead State	8	–	10	.444	13	–	20	.394
Eastern Illinois	7	–	11	.389	14	–	18	.438
UT Martin	6	–	12	.333	12	–	19	.387
SIU Edwardsville	6	–	12	.333	10	–	21	.323
Eastern Kentucky	6	–	12	.333	13	–	18	.419
Tennessee State	6	–	12	.333	9	–	21	.300
Southeast Missouri State	5	–	13	.278	10	–	21	.323
Tennessee Tech	4	–	14	.222	8	–	23	.258
† 2019 OVC tournament winner

The 2018–19 Southeast Missouri State Redhawks men's basketball team represented Southeast Missouri State University during the 2018–19 NCAA Division I men's basketball season. The Redhawks, led by fourth-year head coach Rick Ray, played their home games at the Show Me Center in Cape Girardeau, Missouri as members of the Ohio Valley Conference. They finished the season 10–21 overall, 5–13 in OVC play, finishing in 11th place. Only the top eight teams can play in the OVC tournament, so the Redhawks did not qualify this season.

== Previous season ==
The Redhawks finished the 2017–18 season 14–17, 8–10 in OVC play to finish in seventh place.

The team was ineligible for postseason play this season due to APR violations.

== Roster ==
2018–19 Southeast Missouri State Redhawks men's basketball team
Players
Coaches

Pos.	#	Name	Height	Weight	Year	Hometown
G	0	Alex Caldwell	6 ft 0 in (1.83 m)	170 lb (77 kg)	Fr	Columbia, South Carolina
G	1	Khalil Cuffee	6 ft 4 in (1.93 m)	210 lb (95 kg)	RS Fr	Fairburn, Georgia
G	2	Jordan Love	6 ft 5 in (1.96 m)	165 lb (75 kg)	Fr	Durham, North Carolina
G	3	Skyler Hogan	6 ft 3 in (1.91 m)	180 lb (82 kg)	RS Jr	Melbourne, Florida
G	4	Oscar Kao	6 ft 0 in (1.83 m)	175 lb (79 kg)	So	Taipei, Taiwan
F	5	Jonathan Dalton	5 ft 10 in (1.78 m)	155 lb (70 kg)	Sr	New Orleans, Louisiana
G	11	Nygal Russell	6 ft 4 in (1.93 m)	195 lb (88 kg)	Fr	Houston, Texas
F	13	Isaiah Gable	6 ft 7 in (2.01 m)	195 lb (88 kg)	So	Greenville, Ohio
F	14	Quatarrius Wilson	6 ft 8 in (2.03 m)	200 lb (91 kg)	RS Jr	Mobile, Alabama
G	15	Donnie Lewis	6 ft 1 in (1.85 m)	170 lb (77 kg)	Sr	Lexington, Kentucky
C	22	Jack Lake	6 ft 8 in (2.03 m)	215 lb (98 kg)	RS Sr	Jackson, Missouri
F	23	Sage Talbert	6 ft 8 in (2.03 m)	200 lb (91 kg)	Fr	Richmond, Texas
G	25	Ledarrius Brewer	6 ft 5 in (1.96 m)	200 lb (91 kg)	So	Meridian, Mississippi
G	30	Gabe McGlothan	6 ft 7 in (2.01 m)	225 lb (102 kg)	Fr	Gilbert, Arizona
C	42	Mark Laros	6 ft 10 in (2.08 m)	223 lb (101 kg)	Sr	Hengelo, Netherlands

Head coach

- Rick Ray (Grand View College)

Assistant coach(es)

- Adam Gordon (Tampa)
- Nick Lagroone (Southern Wesleyan)
- Keith Pickens (Missouri State)

Legend

- (C) Team captain
- (S) Suspended
- (I) Ineligible
- (W) Walk-on
- Injured
- Current redshirt

Roster
Last update: September 27, 2018

== Schedule and results ==
Date time, TV	Rank^{#}	Opponent^{#}	Result	Record	Site (attendance) city, state
Exhibition
Oct 27, 2018*; 4:30 pm		Southwest Baptist	W 85–78		Show Me Center (356); Cape Girardeau, MO
Non-conference regular season
Nov 6, 2018*; 7:00 pm, ESPN+		at Saint Louis	L 65–75	0–1	Chaifetz Arena (6,028); St. Louis, MO
Nov 10, 2018*; 1:00 pm, ESPN3		at Bradley	L 57–68	0–2	Carver Arena (5,181); Peoria, IL
Nov 12, 2018*; 6:30 pm, ESPN+		Quincy	W 102–66	1–2	Show Me Center (768); Cape Girardeau, MO
Nov 16, 2018*; 5:00 pm		vs. Jacksonville; Goldie and Herman Ungar Classic	W 77–71	2–2	Mitchell Center (1,585); Mobile, AL
Nov 17, 2018*; 5:00 pm		vs. Chattanooga; Goldie and Herman Ungar Classic	W 63–42	3–2	Mitchell Center (1,605); Mobile, AL
Nov 19, 2018*; 7:00 pm		at South Alabama; Goldie and Herman Ungar Classic	L 58–79	3–3	Mitchell Center (1,482); Mobile, AL
Nov 27, 2018*; 6:30 pm, ESPN+		Missouri S&T	W 72–69	4–3	Show Me Center (650); Cape Girardeau, MO
Dec 1, 2018*; 6:30 pm, ESPN+		Western Illinois	L 63–70	4–4	Show Me Center (821); Cape Girardeau, MO
Dec 4, 2018*; 7:00 pm		at Mississippi Valley State	W 77–57	5–4	Harrison HPER Complex (978); Itta Bena, MS
Dec 8, 2018*; 6:30 pm, ESPN+		Southern Illinois	L 73–83	5–5	Show Me Center (3,432); Cape Girardeau, MO
Dec 15, 2018*; 12:00 pm, ESPN+		at The Citadel	L 74–86	5–6	McAlister Field House (922); Charleston, SC
Dec 17, 2018*; 6:00 p.m., ACCN Extra		at No. 11 Florida State	L 68–85	5–7	Donald L. Tucker Civic Center (5,726); Tallahassee, FL
Dec 21, 2018*; 6:30 pm, ESPN+		Abilene Christian	L 68–70	5–8	Show Me Center (672); Cape Girardeau, MO
Ohio Valley Conference regular season
Jan 3, 2019; 7:30 pm, ESPN+		at SIU Edwardsville	L 88–94	5–9 (0–1)	Vadalabene Center (1,046); Edwardsville, IL
Jan 5, 2019; 4:30 pm, ESPN+		UT Martin	W 74–69 ^{OT}	6–9 (1–1)	Show Me Center (1,287); Cape Girardeau, MO
Jan 10, 2019; 7:45 pm, ESPN+		Austin Peay	L 60–78	6–10 (1–2)	Show Me Center (1,097); Cape Girardeau, MO
Jan 12, 2019; 4:30 pm, ESPN+		Murray State	L 67–85	6–11 (1–3)	Show Me Center (3,143); Cape Girardeau, MO
Jan 17, 2019; 6:30 pm, ESPN+		at Morehead State	L 69–73	6–12 (1–4)	Ellis Johnson Arena (2,024); Morehead, KY
Jan 19, 2019; 6:00 pm, ESPN+		at Eastern Kentucky	L 83–85	6–13 (1–5)	McBrayer Arena (1,860); Richmond, KY
Jan 24, 2019; 7:45 pm, ESPN+		SIU Edwardsville	L 86–87 ^{3OT}	6–14 (1–6)	Show Me Center (1,188); Cape Girardeau, MO
Jan 26, 2019; 4:30 pm, ESPN+		Eastern Illinois	W 64–59	7–14 (2–6)	Show Me Center (1,636); Cape Girardeau, MO
Jan 31, 2019; 7:00 pm, ESPN+		at Belmont	L 71–97	7–15 (2–7)	Curb Event Center (1,821); Nashville, TN
Feb 2, 2019; 7:30 pm, ESPN+		at Tennessee State	L 50–79	7–16 (2–8)	Gentry Complex (983); Nashville, TN
Feb 7, 2019; 7:45 pm, ESPN+		Tennessee Tech	W 71–66 ^{OT}	8–16 (3–8)	Show Me Center; Cape Girardeau, MO
Feb 9, 2019; 4:30 pm, ESPN+		Jacksonville State	L 64–81	8–17 (3–9)	Show Me Center (1,503); Cape Girardeau, MO
Feb 14, 2019; 7:30 pm, ESPN+		at UT Martin	L 72–81	8–18 (3–10)	Skyhawk Arena (1,034); Martin, TN
Feb 16, 2019; 3:15 pm, ESPN+		at Eastern Illinois	W 88–79	9–18 (4–10)	Lantz Arena (1,615); Charleston, IL
Feb 21, 2019; 8:00 pm, ESPN+		at Austin Peay	L 70–83	9–19 (4–11)	Dunn Center (2,176); Clarksville, TN
Feb 23, 2019; 7:00 pm, ESPN+		at Murray State	L 67–103	9–20 (4–12)	CFSB Center (7,762); Murray, KY
Feb 28, 2019; 7:45 pm, ESPN+		Tennessee State	W 89–74	10–20 (5–12)	Show Me Center (1,421); Cape Girardeau, MO
Mar 2, 2019; 7:00 pm, ESPN+		Belmont	L 66–84	10–21 (5–13)	Show Me Center (1,484); Cape Girardeau, MO
*Non-conference game. ^{#}Rankings from AP Poll. (#) Tournament seedings in parentheses. All times are in Central Time Source.
