= 2018–19 Belmont Bruins men's basketball team =

American college basketball season

2018–19 Belmont Bruins men's basketball

Ohio Valley regular season co-champions

NCAA tournament, First Round
- Conference: Ohio Valley Conference
- Record: 27–6 (16–2 OVC)
- Head coach: Rick Byrd (33rd season)
- Assistant coaches: Brian Ayers; James Strong; Tyler Holloway
- Home arena: Curb Event Center

2018–19 Ohio Valley Conference men's basketball standings
	Conf.				Overall
Team	W		L	PCT	W		L	PCT
Belmont	16	–	2	.889	27	–	6	.818
Murray State†	16	–	2	.889	28	–	5	.848
Jacksonville State	15	–	3	.833	24	–	9	.727
Austin Peay	13	–	5	.722	22	–	11	.667
Morehead State	8	–	10	.444	13	–	20	.394
Eastern Illinois	7	–	11	.389	14	–	18	.438
UT Martin	6	–	12	.333	12	–	19	.387
SIU Edwardsville	6	–	12	.333	10	–	21	.323
Eastern Kentucky	6	–	12	.333	13	–	18	.419
Tennessee State	6	–	12	.333	9	–	21	.300
Southeast Missouri State	5	–	13	.278	10	–	21	.323
Tennessee Tech	4	–	14	.222	8	–	23	.258
† 2019 OVC tournament winner

The 2018–19 Belmont Bruins men's basketball team represented Belmont University during the 2018–19 NCAA Division I men's basketball season. The Bruins, led by 33rd-year head coach Rick Byrd, played their home games at the Curb Event Center in Nashville, Tennessee as members of the Ohio Valley Conference. They finished the season 27–6, 16–2 in OVC play to finish in a tie for the regular season championship with Murray State. They defeated Austin Peay in the semifinals of the Ohio Valley tournament before losing to Murray State in the finals. They received an at-large bid to the NCAA tournament, their first ever at-large bid, where they defeated Temple in the First Four before losing in the first round to Maryland.

On April 1, 2019, head coach Rick Byrd announced his retirement. He finished at Belmont with a 33-year record of 713–347.

== Previous season ==
The Bruins finished the 2017–18 season 24–9, 15–3 in OVC play to finish in second place. They defeated Austin Peay in the semifinals of the OVC tournament to advance to the championship game where they lost to Murray State. Despite having 24 wins, they did not participate in a postseason tournament.

== Roster ==
2018–19 Belmont Bruins men's basketball team
Players
Coaches

Pos.	#	Name	Height	Weight	Year	Hometown
G	0	Michael Mayernick	5 ft 8 in (1.73 m)	150 lb (68 kg)	RS Fr	Nashville, Tennessee
G	1	Mitch Listau	6 ft 4 in (1.93 m)	180 lb (82 kg)	RS Fr	Waunakee, Wisconsin
G	2	Grayson Murphy	6 ft 1 in (1.85 m)	170 lb (77 kg)	RS Fr	Thompson's Station, Tennessee
G/F	3	Dylan Windler	6 ft 7 in (2.01 m)	200 lb (91 kg)	Sr	Indianapolis, Indiana
G	5	Adam Kunkel	6 ft 3 in (1.91 m)	170 lb (77 kg)	Fr	Hebron, Kentucky
G/F	10	Caleb Hollander	6 ft 8 in (2.03 m)	230 lb (104 kg)	RS Fr	Nashville, Tennessee
F	11	Kevin McClain	6 ft 2 in (1.88 m)	180 lb (82 kg)	Sr	Jennings, Florida
G	14	Nick Hopkins	5 ft 11 in (1.8 m)	160 lb (73 kg)	RS So	Fayetteville, Tennessee
G	20	Tate Pierson	6 ft 5 in (1.96 m)	180 lb (82 kg)	RS Fr	Brentwood, Tennessee
F	21	Derek Sabin	6 ft 8 in (2.03 m)	225 lb (102 kg)	RS Fr	Slinger, Wisconsin
G	24	Micahel Benkert	6 ft 4 in (1.93 m)	195 lb (88 kg)	RS Jr	Greenwood, Indiana
F	25	Mack Mercer	6 ft 9 in (2.06 m)	230 lb (104 kg)	RS Sr	Plymouth, Indiana
C	33	Nick Muszynski	6 ft 10 in (2.08 m)	225 lb (102 kg)	RS Fr	Pickerington, Ohio
G	35	Garrett Suedekum	6 ft 2 in (1.88 m)	160 lb (73 kg)	RS So	Brentwood, Tennessee
C	50	Seth Adelsperger	6 ft 11 in (2.11 m)	230 lb (104 kg)	RS Jr	Peru, Indiana

Head coach

- Rick Byrd (Tennessee)

Assistant coach(es)

- Brian Ayers (Lipscomb)
- James Strong (Vanderbilt)
- Tyler Holloway (Murray State)

Legend

- (C) Team captain
- (S) Suspended
- (I) Ineligible
- (W) Walk-on
- Injured
- Current redshirt

Roster
Last update: 2018-08-29

== Schedule and results ==
Date time, TV	Rank^{#}	Opponent^{#}	Result	Record	Site (attendance) city, state
Regular season
Nov 10, 2018*; 7:00 pm, ESPN3		Illinois State	W 100–89	1–0	Curb Event Center (3,086); Nashville, TN
Nov 12, 2018*; 7:00 pm, ESPN3		Middle Tennessee	W 92–73	2–0	Curb Event Center (2,148); Nashville, TN
Nov 15, 2018*; 6:30 pm, ESPN+		at Lipscomb; Battle of the Boulevard	W 87–83	3–0	Allen Arena (2,369); Nashville, TN
Nov 20, 2018*; 6:30 pm, ESPN+		Trevecca Nazarene	W 104–50	4–0	Curb Event Center (1,517); Nashville, TN
Nov 24, 2018*; 3:00 pm, ESPN+		at Kennesaw State	W 91–53	5–0	KSU Convocation Center (602); Kennesaw, GA
Nov 29, 2018*; 6:30 pm, ESPN+		at Samford	W 99–93 ^{OT}	6–0	Pete Hanna Center (1,651); Homewood, AL
Dec 1, 2018*; 1:00 pm, ESPN3		at Green Bay	L 92–100	6–1	Resch Center (2,125); Green Bay, WI
Dec 4, 2018*; 6:00 pm, ESPN+		Lipscomb	W 76–74	7–1	Curb Event Center (3,479); Nashville, TN
Dec 15, 2018*; 4:00 pm, P12N		at UCLA	W 74–72	8–1	Pauley Pavilion (8,037); Los Angeles, CA
Dec 19, 2018*; 6:30 pm, ESPN3		Western Kentucky	W 80–74	9–1	Curb Event Center (4,124); Nashville, TN
Dec 29, 2018*; 3:30 pm, FS1		at Purdue	L 62–73	9–2	Mackey Arena (14,804); West Lafayette, IN
Ohio Valley regular season
Jan 3, 2019; 8:00 pm, ESPNU		Jacksonville State	L 73–83	9–3 (0–1)	Curb Event Center (2,518); Nashville, TN
Jan 5, 2019; 5:00 pm, ESPN+		Tennessee Tech	W 79–67	10–3 (1–1)	Curb Event Center (2,385); Nashville, TN
Jan 10, 2019; 6:30 pm, ESPN+		Morehead State	W 77–60	11–3 (2–1)	Curb Event Center (1,704); Nashville, TN
Jan 12, 2019; 5:00 pm, ESPN+		Eastern Kentucky	W 109–93	12–3 (3–1)	Curb Event Center (2,282); Nashville, TN
Jan 17, 2019; 7:15 pm, ESPN+		at Jacksonville State	L 80–91 ^{OT}	12–4 (3–2)	Pete Mathews Coliseum (2,875); Jacksonville, AL
Jan 19, 2019; 5:00 pm, ESPN+		Tennessee State	W 92–74	13–4 (4–2)	Curb Event Center (2,768); Nashville, TN
Jan 24, 2019; 8:00 pm, ESPNU		at Murray State	W 79–66	14–4 (5–2)	CFSB Center (8,969); Murray, KY
Jan 26, 2019; 8:00 pm, ESPN+		at Austin Peay	W 96–92	15–4 (6–2)	Dunn Center (2,215); Clarksville, TN
Jan 31, 2019; 7:00 pm, ESPN+		Southeast Missouri State	W 97–71	16–4 (7–2)	Curb Event Center (1,821); Nashville, TN
Feb 2, 2019; 5:00 pm, ESPN+		UT Martin	W 82–67	17–4 (8–2)	Curb Event Center (2,478); Nashville, TN
Feb 7, 2019; 8:00 pm, ESPN+		at Eastern Kentucky	W 83–65	18–4 (9–2)	McBrayer Arena (1,620); Richmond, KY
Feb 9, 2019; 8:00 pm, ESPN+		at Morehead State	W 96–86	19–4 (10–2)	Ellis Johnson Arena (2,077); Morehead, KY
Feb 14, 2019; 7:30 pm, ESPN+		at Tennessee State	W 77–66	20–4 (11–2)	Gentry Complex (931); Nashville, TN
Feb 16, 2019; 7:30 pm, ESPN+		at Tennessee Tech	W 93–65	21–4 (12–2)	Eblen Center (2,625); Cookeville, TN
Feb 21, 2019; 7:00 pm, ESPN+		Eastern Illinois	W 99–58	22–4 (13–2)	Curb Event Center (2,468); Nashville, TN
Feb 23, 2019; 5:00 pm, ESPN+		SIU Edwardsville	W 97–75	23–4 (14–2)	Curb Event Center (4,094); Nashville, TN
Feb 28, 2019; 7:30 pm, ESPN+		at UT Martin	W 112–67	24–4 (15–2)	Skyhawk Arena (1,316); Martin, TN
Mar 2, 2019; 7:00 pm, ESPN+		at Southeast Missouri State	W 84–66	25–4 (16–2)	Show Me Center (1,484); Cape Girardeau, MO
Ohio Valley Conference tournament
Mar 8, 2019; 7:00 pm, ESPNU	(1)	vs. (4) Austin Peay; Semifinals	W 83–67	26–4	Ford Center (8,294); Evansville, IN
Mar 3, 2018; 7:00 pm, ESPN2	(1)	vs. (2) Murray State; Championship	L 65–77	26–5	Ford Center (10,525); Evansville, IN
NCAA tournament
Mar 19, 2019*; 5:40 pm, truTV	(11 E)	vs. (11 E) Temple; First Four	W 81–70	27–5	UD Arena (11,784); Dayton, OH
Mar 22, 2019*; 2:10 pm, truTV	(11 E)	vs. (6 E) Maryland; First Round	L 77–79	27–6	VyStar Veterans Memorial Arena (12,429); Jacksonville, FL
*Non-conference game. ^{#}Rankings from AP Poll. (#) Tournament seedings in parentheses. E=East. All times are in Central Time.
