= 2018–19 SIU Edwardsville Cougars men's basketball team =

American college basketball season

2018–19 SIU Edwardsville Cougars men's basketball
- Conference: Ohio Valley Conference
- Record: 10–21 (6–12 OVC)
- Head coach: Jon Harris (4th season)
- Assistant coaches: Charles "Bubba" Wells; Brian Barone; Mike Waldo
- Home arena: Vadalabene Center

2018–19 Ohio Valley Conference men's basketball standings
	Conf.				Overall
Team	W		L	PCT	W		L	PCT
Belmont	16	–	2	.889	27	–	6	.818
Murray State†	16	–	2	.889	28	–	5	.848
Jacksonville State	15	–	3	.833	24	–	9	.727
Austin Peay	13	–	5	.722	22	–	11	.667
Morehead State	8	–	10	.444	13	–	20	.394
Eastern Illinois	7	–	11	.389	14	–	18	.438
UT Martin	6	–	12	.333	12	–	19	.387
SIU Edwardsville	6	–	12	.333	10	–	21	.323
Eastern Kentucky	6	–	12	.333	13	–	18	.419
Tennessee State	6	–	12	.333	9	–	21	.300
Southeast Missouri State	5	–	13	.278	10	–	21	.323
Tennessee Tech	4	–	14	.222	8	–	23	.258
† 2019 OVC tournament winner

The 2018–19 SIU Edwardsville Cougars men's basketball team represented Southern Illinois University Edwardsville during the 2018–19 NCAA Division I men's basketball season. The Cougars, led by fourth-year head coach Jon Harris, played their home games at the Vadalabene Center in Edwardsville, Illinois as members of the Ohio Valley Conference (OVC). They finished the season 10–21, 6–12 in OVC play, to finish in a four-way tie for seventh place. As the No. 8 seed, they lost in the first round of the OVC tournament to Morehead State.

== Previous season ==
The Cougars finished the 2017–18 season 9–21, 5–13 in OVC play, to finish in a three-way tie for ninth place. Due to Southeast Missouri State being ineligible for postseason play due to APR violations, the Cougars received the No. 8 seed in the OVC tournament where they lost in the first round to Tennessee Tech.

== Preseason ==
In a vote of conference coaches and sports information directors, SIU Edwardsville was picked to finish in 12th place in the OVC.

== Postseason ==
On March 11, 2019, SIUE announced that coach Jon Harris's contract had not been renewed after a four-year record of 31 wins and 88 losses. Assistant coaches Brian Barone, Charles "Bubba" Wells and Mike Waldo were all retained, with Barone being named as interim head coach. Former head coach Marty Simmons, one of only three Cougars coaches with a winning record, had expressed an interest in returning.

== Roster ==
2018–19 SIU Edwardsville Cougars men's basketball team
Players
Coaches

Pos.	#	Name	Height	Weight	Year	Previous school	Hometown
F	0	Treavon Martin	6 ft 8 in (2.03 m)	210 lb (95 kg)	Fr	Curie HS	Chicago, IL
F	1	D.J. Jackson	6 ft 5 in (1.96 m)	190 lb (86 kg)	So	Fayette Ware HS	Moscow, TN
G	2	D'Quan Applewhite (xW)	6 ft 3 in (1.91 m)	180 lb (82 kg)	RS Jr	Thornton Township HS	Harvey, IL
G	3	Daniel Kinchen	6 ft 3 in (1.91 m)	170 lb (77 kg)	Sr	Alabama Southern CC/Stephenson HS	Atlanta, GA
G	5	Tyresse Williford	5 ft 10 in (1.78 m)	165 lb (75 kg)	Jr	Wabash Valley CC/Marshall HS	Chicago, IL
F	10	Bill Awet	6 ft 8 in (2.03 m)	200 lb (91 kg)	RS So	Victory Rock Prep	Sydney, Australia
G	13	Christian Ellis	6 ft 2 in (1.88 m)	190 lb (86 kg)	Jr	Modesto Christian HS	Oakland, CA
G	15	David McFarland	6 ft 4 in (1.93 m)	180 lb (82 kg)	Sr	East Mississippi CC/Raymond HS	Edwards, MS
G	21	Blake Lindenmeyer (W)	6 ft 0 in (1.83 m)	180 lb (82 kg)	So	Arcola HS	Arcola, IL
G	22	Justin Benton (redshirt)	6 ft 4 in (1.93 m)	195 lb (88 kg)	Jr	Houston HS	Memphis, TN
C	23	Elochukwu Eze	6 ft 10 in (2.08 m)	240 lb (109 kg)	Fr	Asheville Christian Academy	Enugu, Nigeria
F	24	Cameron Williams	6 ft 2 in (1.88 m)	190 lb (86 kg)	Fr	Hazelwood Central HS	St. Louis, MO
G	25	Jaylen McCoy	5 ft 11 in (1.8 m)	180 lb (82 kg)	Sr	Wallace State CC/Saint James School	Montgomery, AL
G/F	30	Anselm Uzuegbunem	6 ft 7 in (2.01 m)	235 lb (107 kg)	Jr	Northern Oklahoma CC/Harding Charter Prep HS	Oklahoma City, OK
G	31	Jackson Best (W)	5 ft 9 in (1.75 m)	165 lb (75 kg)	So	Edwardsville HS	Edwardsville, IL
F	32	Brandon Jackson	6 ft 7 in (2.01 m)	215 lb (98 kg)	Jr	Cardinal Ritter HS	East St. Louis, IL

Head coach

- Jon Harris

Assistant coach(es)

- Bubba Wells
- Brian Barone
- Mike Waldo

Legend

- (C) Team captain
- (S) Suspended
- (I) Ineligible
- (W) Walk-on
- Injured
- Current redshirt

Roster
Last update: July 16, 2024

== Schedule and results ==
Date time, TV	Rank^{#}	Opponent^{#}	Result	Record	High points	High rebounds	High assists	Site (attendance) city, state
Exhibition
November 2, 2018*; 6:00 p.m., ESPN+		Kentucky State	W 80–61		17 – B. Jackson	10 – Uzuegbunem	7 – Ellis	Vadalabene Center (1,107); Edwardsville, IL
Non-conference regular season
November 6, 2018*; 7:00 p.m., ESPN+		Pacific	L 65–74	0–1	17 – McFarland	7 – B. Jackson	4 – Williams	Vadalabene Center (1,387); Edwardsville, IL
November 10, 2018*; 7:00 p.m., ESPN+		Winthrop	L 82–94	0–2	20 – McFarland	7 – Uzuegbunem	5 – Ellis	Vadalabene Center (1,358); Edwardsville, IL
November 21, 2018*; 7:00 p.m.		at Valparaiso	L 70–75 ^{OT}	0-3	24 – Williford	7 – Ellis & B. Jackson	4 – Williford	Athletics–Recreation Center (1,940); Valparaiso, IN
November 25, 2018*; 2:00 p.m., ESPN+		Incarnate Word	W 80–68	1–3	20 – Williford	6 – Williford	8 – Williford	Vadalabene Center (1,011); Edwardsville, IL
November 28, 2018*; 7:00 p.m.		at Western Illinois	L 58-83	1–4	12 – McFarland	6 – Ellis	4 – Williford	Western Hall (441); Macomb, IL
December 1, 2018*; 2:00 p.m., ESPN+		Southern Illinois	L 61–82	1–5	24 – McFarland	7 – B. Jackson	3 – Martin, McFarland & Williford	Vadalabene Center (3,360); Edwardsville, IL
December 8, 2018*; 2:00 p.m., ESPN+		Harris–Stowe	W 92–87	2–5	28 – B. Jackson	11 – B. Jackson	4 – Williford	Vadalabene Center (856); Edwardsville, IL
December 17, 2018*; 7:00 p.m., ESPN+		at Drake; Las Vegas Classic campus game	L 66–79	2–6	21 – McFarland	6 – B. Jackson	2 – Kinchen	Knapp Center (2,375); Des Moines, IA
December 19, 2018*; 9:30 p.m., P12N		at Washington State; Las Vegas Classic campus game	L 73–89	2–7	24 – McFarland	7 – McFarland	3 – McFarland & McCoy	Beasley Coliseum (1,776); Pullman, WA
December 22, 2018*; 1:00 p.m.		Cal State Northridge; Las Vegas Classic Visitors Bracket semifinals	L 79–85	2–8	18 – McFarland	7 – B. Jackson & D.J. Jackson	6 – Williford	Orleans Arena; Paradise, NV
December 23, 2018*; 1:00 p.m.		Northern Colorado; Las Vegas Classic Visitors Bracket third-place game	W 82–72	3–8	25 – Williford	8 – Williams	3 – Williford	Orleans Arena; Paradise, NV
December 30, 2018*; 5:00 p.m., ESPN+		Missouri S&T	W 79–66	4–8	16 – Williams	6 – B. Jackson, Uzuegbunem & Williford	6 – Williford	Vadalabene Center (1,137); Edwardsville, IL
Ohio Valley Conference regular season
January 3, 2019; 7:30 p.m., ESPN+		Southeast Missouri State	W 94–88	5–8 (1–0)	27 – Williams	8 – B. Jackson	6 – Williford	Vadalabene Center (1,048); Edwardsville, IL
January 5, 2019; 3:15 p.m., ESPN+		at Eastern Illinois	L 81–84 ^{OT}	5–9 (1–1)	26 – B. Jackson	9 – B. Jackson	11 – Williford	Lantz Arena (1,088); Charleston, IL
January 10, 2019; 7:30 p.m., ESPN+		at Tennessee Tech	L 69–78 ^{OT}	5–10 (1–2)	17 – McFarland	7 – B. Jackson	6 – Ellis	Eblen Center (1,674); Cookeville, TN
January 12, 2019; 4:00 p.m., ESPN+		at Jacksonville State	L 54–90	5–11 (1–3)	10 – McFarland	5 – Uzuegbunem	2 – Williford	Pete Mathews Coliseum (2,189); Jacksonville, AL
January 17, 2019; 7:30 p.m., ESPN+		Austin Peay	L 71–79	5–12 (1–4)	16 – Williams	8 – B. Jackson	4 – Ellis & Williford	Vadalabene Center (1,322); Edwardsville, IL
January 19, 2019; 7:00 p.m., ESPN+		Murray State	L 72–82	5–13 (1–5)	33 – Williford	6 – B. Jackson	4 – Williford	Vadalabene Center (2,178); Edwardsville, IL
January 24, 2019; 7:45 p.m., ESPN+		at Southeast Missouri State	W 87–86 ^{3OT}	6–13 (2–5)	21 – McFarland	15 – B. Jackson	5 – Williford	Show Me Center (1,188); Cape Girardeau, MO
January 26, 2019; 3:30 p.m., ESPN+		at UT Martin	L 69–85	6–14 (2–6)	19 – McFarland	8 – Martin	5 – Williford	Skyhawk Arena (1,031); Martin, TN
January 31, 2019; 7:00 p.m., ESPN+		Morehead State	W 83–76	7–14 (3–6)	23 – Williford	5 – Uzuegbunem	4 – Ellis	Vadalabene Center (1,079); Edwardsville, IL
February 2, 2019; 7:00 p.m., ESPN+		Eastern Kentucky	W 88–82 ^{2OT}	8–14 (4–6)	27 – Williford	13 – Uzuegbunem	6 – Ellis	Vadalabene Center (1,060); Edwardsville, IL
February 7, 2019; 7:30 p.m., ESPN+		at Austin Peay	L 45–80	8–15 (4–7)	12 – B. Jackson	8 – B. Jackson	4 – Williford	Dunn Center (1,479); Clarksville, TN
February 9, 2019; 7:00 p.m., ESPN+		at Murray State	L 55–86	8–16 (4–8)	14 – McFarland	8 – B. Jackson	3 – McCoy	CFSB Center (8,007); Murray, KY
February 14, 2019; 5:30 p.m., ESPN+		Eastern Illinois	L 65–79	8–17 (4–9)	16 – B. Jackson	10 – B. Jackson	6 – McFarland	Vadalabene Center (1,012); Edwardsville, IL
February 16, 2019; 7:30 p.m., ESPN+		UT Martin	L 69–73	8–18 (4–10)	15 – McFarland	6 – B. Jackson	5 – Williams	Vadalabene Center (1,011); Edwardsville, IL
February 21, 2019; 7:30 p.m., ESPN+		at Tennessee State	W 85–84	9–18 (5–10)	22 – B. Jackson	7 – Uzuegbunem	3 – Williams	Gentry Complex (2,301); Nashville, TN
February 23, 2019; 5:00 p.m., ESPN+		at Belmont	L 75–97	9–19 (5–11)	22 – B. Jackson	7 – Uzuegbunem	5 – Williford	Curb Event Center (4,094); Nashville, TN
February 28, 2019; 7:30 p.m., ESPN+		Tennessee Tech	W 76–68	10–19 (6–11)	16 – B. Jackson	8 – B. Jackson & Uzuegbunem	6 – Williford	Vadalabene Center (1,350); Edwardsville, IL
March 2, 2019; 5:00 p.m., ESPN+		Jacksonville State	L 72–97	10–20 (6–12)	19 – B. Jackson	4 – McFarland	5 – McCoy	Vadalabene Center (1,631); Edwardsville, IL
Ohio Valley Conference tournament
March 6, 2019; 6:30 p.m., ESPN+	(8)	vs. (5) Morehead State; First round	L 68–72	10–21	17 – B. Jackson	9 – B. Jackson	5 – McFarland	Ford Center; Evansville, IN
*Non-conference game. ^{#}Rankings from AP poll. (#) Tournament seedings in parentheses. All times are in Central.
