= 2018–19 Jacksonville State Gamecocks men's basketball team =

American college basketball season

2018–19 Jacksonville State Gamecocks men's basketball

Cancún Challenge Mayan Division champions
- Conference: Ohio Valley Conference
- Record: 24–9 (15–3 OVC)
- Head coach: Ray Harper (3rd season)
- Assistant coaches: Chase Richardson; Jake Morton; Tommy Wade
- Home arena: Pete Mathews Coliseum

2018–19 Ohio Valley Conference men's basketball standings
	Conf.				Overall
Team	W		L	PCT	W		L	PCT
Belmont	16	–	2	.889	27	–	6	.818
Murray State†	16	–	2	.889	28	–	5	.848
Jacksonville State	15	–	3	.833	24	–	9	.727
Austin Peay	13	–	5	.722	22	–	11	.667
Morehead State	8	–	10	.444	13	–	20	.394
Eastern Illinois	7	–	11	.389	14	–	18	.438
UT Martin	6	–	12	.333	12	–	19	.387
SIU Edwardsville	6	–	12	.333	10	–	21	.323
Eastern Kentucky	6	–	12	.333	13	–	18	.419
Tennessee State	6	–	12	.333	9	–	21	.300
Southeast Missouri State	5	–	13	.278	10	–	21	.323
Tennessee Tech	4	–	14	.222	8	–	23	.258
† 2019 OVC tournament winner

The 2018–19 Jacksonville State Gamecocks men's basketball team represented Jacksonville State University during the 2018–19 NCAA Division I men's basketball season. The Gamecocks, led by third-year head coach Ray Harper, played their home games at the Pete Mathews Coliseum in Jacksonville, Alabama as members of the Ohio Valley Conference. They finished the season 24–9, 15–3 in OVC play, to finish in third place. They defeated UT Martin in the quarterfinals of the OVC tournament before losing in the semifinals to Murray State. Despite having 24 wins, they did not participate in a postseason tournament.

== Previous season ==
The Gamecocks finished the 2017–18 season 23–13, 11–7 in OVC play, to finish in fourth place. They defeated Tennessee Tech in the quarterfinals of the OVC tournament before losing in the semifinals to Murray State. They were invited to the College Basketball Invitational where they defeated Canisius and Central Arkansas to advance to the semifinals where they lost to North Texas.

== Roster ==
2018–19 Jacksonville State Gamecocks men's basketball team
Players
Coaches

Pos.	#	Name	Height	Weight	Year	Hometown
G	0	Jamall Gregory	6 ft 3 in (1.91 m)	202 lb (92 kg)	Sr	Washington, D.C.
G	1	Cam Jones	6 ft 6 in (1.98 m)	190 lb (86 kg)	Fr	Memphis, Tennessee
G	2	Detrick Mostella	6 ft 1 in (1.85 m)	175 lb (79 kg)	RS Sr	Decatur, Alabama
C	3	Maros Zeliznak	6 ft 11 in (2.11 m)	250 lb (113 kg)	Fr	Košice, Slovakia
G	4	Ty Hudson	6 ft 1 in (1.85 m)	200 lb (91 kg)	Jr	Baton Rouge, Louisiana
G	10	Maurice Dunlap	6 ft 2 in (1.88 m)	175 lb (79 kg)	Sr	Greenwood, Mississippi
F	11	Jacara Cross	6 ft 8 in (2.03 m)	240 lb (109 kg)	Jr	Lithonia, Georgia
F	14	Jason Burnell	6 ft 7 in (2.01 m)	220 lb (100 kg)	Sr	DeLand, Florida
G	23	Marlon Hunter	6 ft 3 in (1.91 m)	195 lb (88 kg)	Sr	Panama City, Florida
F	31	Christian Cunningham	6 ft 7 in (2.01 m)	215 lb (98 kg)	Sr	Albuquerque, New Mexico
G	33	De'Torrion Ware	6 ft 4 in (1.93 m)	200 lb (91 kg)	Fr	Hopkinsville, Kentucky

Head coach

- Ray Harper (Kentucky Wesleyan)

Assistant coach(es)

- Chase Richardson (Western Kentucky)
- Jake Morton (Miami (FL))
- Tommy Wade (Southeast Missouri State)

Legend

- (C) Team captain
- (S) Suspended
- (I) Ineligible
- (W) Walk-on
- Injured
- Current redshirt

Roster

== Schedule and results ==
Date time, TV	Rank^{#}	Opponent^{#}	Result	Record	Site (attendance) city, state
Non-conference regular season
Nov 9, 2018*; 6:30 pm, ESPN3		at Samford	L 72–92	0–1	Pete Hanna Center (1,443); Homewood, AL
Nov 12, 2018*; 6:00 pm, BTN		at Penn State; Cancún Challenge campus game	L 61–76	0–2	Bryce Jordan Center (7,722); University Park, PA
Nov 14, 2018*; 7:00 pm, ESPN+		at Bradley; Cancún Challenge campus game	L 65–74	0–3	Carver Arena (4,706); Peoria, IL
Nov 20, 2018*; 11:30 pm, CBS Digital		vs. Western Carolina; Cancún Challenge Mayan Division semifinals	W 84–53	1–3	Hard Rock Hotel Riviera Convention Center (200); Cancún, Mexico
Nov 21, 2018*; 2:00pm, CBS Digital		vs. North Florida; Cancún Challenge Mayan Division championship	W 83–78	2–3	Hard Rock Hotel Riviera Convention Center (121); Cancún, Mexico
Nov 28, 2018*; 11:30 am		vs. Carver College	W 101–61	3–3	Cherokee Center & Arena (1,571); Centre, AL
Dec 1, 2018*; 12:00 pm, ESPN+		at North Alabama	W 76–65	4–3	Flowers Hall (844); Florence, AL
Dec 8, 2018*; 3:00 pm		at Delaware State	W 81–54	5–3	Memorial Hall (617); Dover, DE
Dec 12, 2018*; 7:00 pm		at Wichita State	L 65–69	5–4	Charles Koch Arena (10,028); Wichita, KS
Dec 15, 2018*; 1:00 pm, ESPN3		at Evansville	W 55–50	6–4	Ford Center (4,814); Evansville, IN
Dec 18, 2018*; 7:15 pm, ESPN+		North Alabama	W 64–50	7–4	Pete Mathews Coliseum (1,295); Jacksonville, AL
Dec 22, 2018*; 11:00 am, ATTSNPT		at West Virginia	L 72–74	7–5	WVU Coliseum (8,231); Morgantown, WV
Dec 29, 2018*; 4:00 pm, ESPN+		Reinhardt	W 109–77	8–5	Pete Mathews Coliseum (1,229); Jacksonville, AL
Ohio Valley Conference regular season
Jan 3, 2019; 8:00 pm, ESPNU		at Belmont	W 83–73	9–5 (1–0)	Curb Event Center (2,518); Nashville, TN
Jan 5, 2019; 5:00 pm, ESPN+		at Tennessee State	W 69–62	10–5 (2–0)	Gentry Complex (710); Nashville, TN
Jan 10, 2019; 7:15 pm, ESPN+		Eastern Illinois	W 69–62	11–5 (3–0)	Pete Mathews Coliseum (2,275); Jacksonville, AL
Jan 12, 2019; 4:00 pm, ESPN+		SIU Edwardsville	W 90–54	12–5 (4–0)	Pete Mathews Coliseum (2,189); Jacksonville, AL
Jan 17, 2019; 7:15 pm, ESPN+		Belmont	W 91–80	13–5 (5–0)	Pete Mathews Coliseum (2,875); Jacksonville, AL
Jan 19, 2019; 7:00 pm, ESPN+		Tennessee Tech	W 65–48	14–5 (6–0)	Pete Mathews Coliseum (1,019); Jacksonville, AL
Jan 24, 2019; 6:00 pm, ESPN+		at Eastern Kentucky	L 70–88	14–6 (6–1)	Seabury Center (1,280); Berea, KY
Jan 26, 2019; 2:35 pm, ESPN+		at Morehead State	W 77–71	15–6 (7–1)	Ellis Johnson Arena (2,147); Morehead, KY
Jan 31, 2019; 7:15 pm, ESPN+		Murray State	W 88–68	16–6 (8–1)	Pete Mathews Coliseum (3,718); Jacksonville, AL
Feb 2, 2019; 4:00 pm, ESPN+		Austin Peay	L 71–74	16–7 (8–2)	Pete Mathews Coliseum (2,802); Jacksonville, AL
Feb 7, 2019; 7:30 pm, ESPN+		at UT Martin	L 64–66	16–8 (8–3)	Skyhawk Arena (942); Martin, TN
Feb 9, 2019; 4:15 pm, ESPN+		at Southeast Missouri State	W 81–64	17–8 (9–3)	Show Me Center (1,503); Cape Girardeau, MO
Feb 14, 2019; 7:30 pm, ESPN+		at Tennessee Tech	W 67–57	18–8 (10–3)	Eblen Center (1,159); Cookeville, TN
Feb 16, 2019; 7:00 pm, ESPN+		Tennessee State	W 84–65	19–8 (11–3)	Pete Mathews Coliseum (2,223); Jacksonville, AL
Feb 21, 2019; 7:15 pm, ESPN+		Morehead State	W 65–64	20–8 (12–3)	Pete Mathews Coliseum (2,134); Jacksonville, AL
Feb 23, 2019; 4:00 pm, ESPN+		Eastern Kentucky	W 104–101 ^{OT}	21–8 (13–3)	Pete Mathews Coliseum (2,423); Jacksonville, AL
Feb 28, 2019; 8:00 pm, ESPNews		at Eastern Illinois	W 89–84 ^{OT}	22–8 (14–3)	Lantz Arena (1,414); Charleston, IL
Mar 2, 2019; 5:00 pm, ESPN+		at Tennessee Tech	W 97–72	23–8 (15–3)	Vadalabene Center (1,631); Edwardsville, IL
Ohio Valley Conference tournament
Mar 8, 2019; 10:30 pm	(3)	vs. (7) UT Martin; Quarterfinals	W 88–81	24–8	Ford Center (1,040); Evansville, IN
Mar 9, 2019; 11:00 pm, ESPNU	(3)	vs. (2) Murray State; Semifinals	L 74–76	24–9	Ford Center (8,294); Evansville, IN
*Non-conference game. ^{#}Rankings from AP poll. (#) Tournament seedings in parentheses. All times are in Central Time. Source
