= 2018–19 Tennessee State Tigers basketball team =

American college basketball season

2018–19 Tennessee State Tigers basketball
- Conference: Ohio Valley Conference
- Record: 9–21 (6–12 OVC)
- Head coach: Brian Collins (1st season)
- Assistant coaches: Ben Walker; Jerry Nichols; Russ Willemsen
- Home arena: Gentry Complex

2018–19 Ohio Valley Conference men's basketball standings
	Conf.				Overall
Team	W		L	PCT	W		L	PCT
Belmont	16	–	2	.889	27	–	6	.818
Murray State†	16	–	2	.889	28	–	5	.848
Jacksonville State	15	–	3	.833	24	–	9	.727
Austin Peay	13	–	5	.722	22	–	11	.667
Morehead State	8	–	10	.444	13	–	20	.394
Eastern Illinois	7	–	11	.389	14	–	18	.438
UT Martin	6	–	12	.333	12	–	19	.387
SIU Edwardsville	6	–	12	.333	10	–	21	.323
Eastern Kentucky	6	–	12	.333	13	–	18	.419
Tennessee State	6	–	12	.333	9	–	21	.300
Southeast Missouri State	5	–	13	.278	10	–	21	.323
Tennessee Tech	4	–	14	.222	8	–	23	.258
† 2019 OVC tournament winner

The 2018–19 Tennessee State Tigers basketball team represented Tennessee State University during the 2018–19 NCAA Division I men's basketball season. The Tigers, led by first-year head coach Brian Collins, played their home games at the Gentry Complex in Nashville, Tennessee as members of the Ohio Valley Conference. They finished the season 9–21 overall, 6–12 during OVC play, and finishing in a four-way tie for seventh place. Since only the top eight teams in the conference qualify for the OVC tournament, tiebreakers left Tennessee State as the No. 9 seed, preventing them from participating.

== Previous season ==
The Tigers finished the 2017–18 season 15–15, 10–8 in OVC play to finish in a tie for fifth place. They lost in the first round of the OVC tournament to Eastern Illinois.

On March 21, 2018, head coach Dana Ford left Tennessee State for the head coaching job at Missouri State. He finished at Tennessee State with a four-year record of 57–65. On March 26, the school announced that former Illinois State assistant coach Brian Collins had been hired as head coach.

== Roster ==
2018–19 Tennessee State Tigers men's basketball team
Players
Coaches

Pos.	#	Name	Height	Weight	Year	Hometown
G	0	Armani Chaney	5 ft 10 in (1.78 m)	165 lb (75 kg)	Sr	Chicago, Illinois
G	1	Michael Littlejohn	5 ft 10 in (1.78 m)	160 lb (73 kg)	Jr	Muskegon, Michigan
F	2	Emmanuel Egbuta	6 ft 7 in (2.01 m)	230 lb (104 kg)	Jr	Bronx, New York
G	3	Donte Fitzpatrick-Dorsey	6 ft 4 in (1.93 m)	191 lb (87 kg)	RS Jr	Memphis, Tennessee
F	4	Damarri Moore	6 ft 8 in (2.03 m)	190 lb (86 kg)	Jr	Brooklyn, New York
G	5	David Morris	6 ft 1 in (1.85 m)	175 lb (79 kg)	RS Fr	Erie, Pennsylvania
G	10	Tripp Davis	6 ft 3 in (1.91 m)	180 lb (82 kg)	RS Jr	Nashville, Tennessee
G	11	Kamar McKnight	6 ft 4 in (1.93 m)	205 lb (93 kg)	RS Jr	Toronto, Ontario
G	12	Monty Johal	6 ft 3 in (1.91 m)	185 lb (84 kg)	Fr	Springfield, Missouri
F	15	Demarcus Mitchell	6 ft 7 in (2.01 m)	220 lb (100 kg)	RS Fr	Memphis, Tennessee
F	20	Jy'lan Washington	6 ft 9 in (2.06 m)	195 lb (88 kg)	RS Sr	Smyrna, Tennessee
G/F	22	Daniel Cummings	6 ft 5 in (1.96 m)	225 lb (102 kg)	RS So	Toronto, Ontario, Canada
F	23	DaJion Henderson	6 ft 7 in (2.01 m)	275 lb (125 kg)	RS Jr	Los Angeles, California
F	30	Stokley Chaffee, Jr.	6 ft 8 in (2.03 m)	215 lb (98 kg)	RS Sr	Oakland, California
G	34	Jalen Duke	6 ft 5 in (1.96 m)	213 lb (97 kg)	RS Jr	Nashville, Tennessee

Head coach

- Brian Collins (Belmont)

Assistant coach(es)

- Ben Walker (Creighton)
- Jerry Nichols (Arkansas State)
- Russ Willemsen (Lee)

Legend

- (C) Team captain
- (S) Suspended
- (I) Ineligible
- (W) Walk-on
- Injured
- Current redshirt

Roster
Last update: September 27, 2018

== Schedule and results ==
Date time, TV	Opponent	Result	Record	Site (attendance) city, state
Exhibition
Oct 31, 2018*; 7:00 pm	Tennessee Wesleyan	W 107–72		Gentry Complex (764); Nashville, TN
Non-conference regular season
Nov 10, 2018*; 3:00 pm, ESPN+	at Lipscomb	L 79–86	0–1	Allen Arena (2,596); Nashville, TN
Nov 13, 2018*; 7:00 pm, ESPN+	Little Rock	L 67–83	0–2	Gentry Complex (679); Nashville, TN
Nov 15, 2018*; 6:00 pm, ESPN+	Carver; Ohio Valley Hardwood Showcase	W 92–57	1–2	Gentry Complex (721); Nashville, TN
Nov 17, 2018*; 7:00 pm, ESPN+	Fisk; Ohio Valley Hardwood Showcase	W 113–61	2–2	Gentry Complex (1,682); Nashville, TN
Nov 20, 2018*; 9:00 pm	at Cal State Northridge	L 77–80	2–3	Matadome (858); Northridge, CA
Nov 23, 2018*; 6:00 pm, SECN	at No. 10 Kentucky; Ohio Valley Hardwood Showcase	L 62–77	2–4	Rupp Arena (20,224); Lexington, KY
Dec 1, 2018*; 6:00 pm, ESPN+	at Western Kentucky	L 74–88	2–5	E. A. Diddle Arena (6,071); Bowling Green, KY
Dec 9, 2018*; 2:00 pm	at Coppin State	W 64–55	3–5	Physical Education Complex (347); Baltimore, MD
Dec 15, 2018*; 4:00 pm, ESPN+	North Carolina A&T	L 76–78	3–6	Gentry Complex (303); Nashville, TN
Dec 18, 2018*; 6:00 pm, ESPN+	at Akron	L 62–80	3–7	James A. Rhodes Arena (2,151); Akron, OH
Dec 22, 2018*; 2:00 pm, ESPN3	at Memphis	L 41–99	3–8	FedExForum (15,378); Memphis, TN
Dec 29, 2018*; 12:30 pm, SECN+	at Vanderbilt	L 76–95	3–9	Memorial Gymnasium (9,505); Nashville, TN
Ohio Valley Conference regular season
Jan 3, 2019; 7:30 pm, ESPN+	Tennessee Tech	L 64–66	3–10 (0–1)	Gentry Complex (632); Nashville, TN
Jan 5, 2019; 5:00 pm, ESPN+	Jacksonville State	L 62–69	3–11 (0–2)	Gentry Complex (710); Nashville, TN
Jan 10, 2019; 7:30 pm, ESPN+	Eastern Kentucky	W 82–81	4–11 (1–2)	Gentry Complex (411); Nashville, TN
Jan 12, 2019; 7:30 pm, ESPN+	Morehead State	L 61–74	4–12 (1–3)	Gentry Complex (653); Nashville, TN
Jan 17, 2019; 6:00 pm, ESPNU	at Tennessee Tech	W 79–62	5–12 (2–3)	Eblen Center (1,276); Cookeville, TN
Jan 19, 2019; 5:00 pm, ESPN+	at Belmont	L 74–92	5–13 (2–4)	Curb Event Center (2,768); Nashville, TN
Jan 24, 2019; 8:00 pm, ESPN+	at Austin Peay	L 74–89	5–14 (2–5)	Dunn Center (1,943); Clarksville, TN
Jan 26, 2019; 7:00 pm, ESPN+	at Murray State	L 62–100	5–15 (2–6)	CFSB Center (7,059); Murray, KY
Jan 31, 2019; 7:30 pm, ESPN+	UT Martin	W 68–67	6–15 (3–6)	Gentry Complex (1,025); Nashville, TN
Feb 2, 2019; 7:30 pm, ESPN+	Southeast Missouri State	W 79–50	7–15 (4–6)	Gentry Complex (983); Nashville, TN
Feb 7, 2019; 6:30 pm, ESPN+	at Morehead State	W 81–80 ^{2OT}	8-15 (5-6)	Ellis Johnson Arena (2,066); Morehead, KY
Feb 9, 2019; 6:00 pm, ESPN+	at Eastern Kentucky	L 65–75	8–16 (5–7)	McBrayer Arena (1,640); Richmond, KY
Feb 14, 2019; 7:30 pm, ESPN+	Belmont	L 66–77	8–17 (5–8)	Gentry Complex (931); Nashville, TN
Feb 16, 2019; 7:00 pm, ESPN+	at Jacksonville State	L 65–84	8–18 (5–9)	Pete Mathews Coliseum (2,223); Jacksonville, AL
Feb 21, 2019; 7:30 pm, ESPN+	SIU Edwardsville	L 84–85	8–19 (5–10)	Gentry Complex (2,301); Nashville, TN
Feb 23, 2019; 7:30 pm, ESPN+	Eastern Illinois	W 75–60	9–19 (6–10)	Gentry Complex (1,511); Nashville, TN
Feb 28, 2019; 7:45 pm, ESPN+	at Southeast Missouri State	L 74–89	9–20 (6–11)	Show Me Center (1,421); Cape Girardeau, MO
Mar 2, 2019; 3:30 pm, ESPN+	at UT Martin	L 86–91	9–21 (6–12)	Skyhawk Arena (1,291); Martin, TN
*Non-conference game. ^{#}Rankings from AP Poll. (#) Tournament seedings in parentheses. All times are in Central Time.
