= 2018–19 Eastern Illinois Panthers men's basketball team =

American college basketball season

2018–19 Eastern Illinois Panthers men's basketball
- Conference: Ohio Valley Conference
- Record: 14–18 (7–11 OVC)
- Head coach: Jay Spoonhour (7th season)
- Assistant coaches: Rand Chappell; Tone Boyle; Justin Brown
- Home arena: Lantz Arena

2018–19 Ohio Valley Conference men's basketball standings
	Conf.				Overall
Team	W		L	PCT	W		L	PCT
Belmont	16	–	2	.889	27	–	6	.818
Murray State†	16	–	2	.889	28	–	5	.848
Jacksonville State	15	–	3	.833	24	–	9	.727
Austin Peay	13	–	5	.722	22	–	11	.667
Morehead State	8	–	10	.444	13	–	20	.394
Eastern Illinois	7	–	11	.389	14	–	18	.438
UT Martin	6	–	12	.333	12	–	19	.387
SIU Edwardsville	6	–	12	.333	10	–	21	.323
Eastern Kentucky	6	–	12	.333	13	–	18	.419
Tennessee State	6	–	12	.333	9	–	21	.300
Southeast Missouri State	5	–	13	.278	10	–	21	.323
Tennessee Tech	4	–	14	.222	8	–	23	.258
† 2019 OVC tournament winner

The 2018–19 Eastern Illinois Panthers men's basketball team represented Eastern Illinois University during the 2018–19 NCAA Division I men's basketball season. The Panthers, led by seventh-year head coach Jay Spoonhour, played their home games at Lantz Arena as members of the Ohio Valley Conference. They finished the season 14–18, 7–11 in OVC play to finish in sixth place. They lost to UT Martin in the first round of the OVC tournament.

== Previous season ==
The Panthers finished the 2017–18 season 12–19, 7–11 in OVC play to finish in eighth place. They defeated Tennessee State in the first round of the OVC tournament before losing in the quarterfinals to Austin Peay.

== Preseason ==
In a vote of conference coaches and sports information directors, EIU was picked to finish in 7th place in the OVC.

=== Preseason All-OVC team ===
The Panthers had one player selected to the preseason all-OVC team.

- Terrell Lewis — Guard

== Roster ==
2018–19 Eastern Illinois Panthers men's basketball team
Players
Coaches

Pos.	#	Name	Height	Weight	Year	Hometown
G	1	Kashawn Charles	6 ft 1 in (1.85 m)	185 lb (84 kg)	So	Wyandanch, New York
G	2	Terrell Lewis	5 ft 7 in (1.7 m)	150 lb (68 kg)	RS Sr	St. Louis, Missouri
G	3	Mack Smith	6 ft 2 in (1.88 m)	185 lb (84 kg)	So	Indianapolis, IN
G	5	Shareef Smith	5 ft 10 in (1.78 m)	180 lb (82 kg)	Jr	Madison, Wisconsin
F	5	Cam Burrell	6 ft 7 in (2.01 m)	175 lb (79 kg)	Fr	Chicago, Illinois
G	11	Logan Koch	6 ft 1 in (1.85 m)	200 lb (91 kg)	Jr	Shawnee, Kansas
G	13	Shawn Wilson	5 ft 11 in (1.8 m)	165 lb (75 kg)	Jr	Harvey, Illinois
G	21	Braxton Shaw	6 ft 7 in (2.01 m)	—	Jr	Fontana, California
G	22	Josiah Wallace	6 ft 4 in (1.93 m)	185 lb (84 kg)	So	Marshall, Illinois
G	23	Ben Harvey	6 ft 5 in (1.96 m)	190 lb (86 kg)	Fr	Jonesboro, Arkansas
F	24	Rade Kukobat	6 ft 9 in (2.06 m)	225 lb (102 kg)	Jr	Gary, Indiana
F	32	JaQualis Matlock	6 ft 5 in (1.96 m)	225 lb (102 kg)	Jr	Hopkinsville, Kentucky
F	40	Lucas Jones	6 ft 8 in (2.03 m)	205 lb (93 kg)	Sr	Prairie Village, Kansas
F	55	Aboubacar Diallo	6 ft 9 in (2.06 m)	200 lb (91 kg)	Sr	Abidjan, Ivory Coast

Head coach

- Jay Spoonhour (Pittsburg State)

Assistant coach(es)

- Rand Chappell (Missouri State)
- Tone Boyle (Milwaukee)
- Justin Brown (Southwest Baptist)

Legend

- (C) Team captain
- (S) Suspended
- (I) Ineligible
- (W) Walk-on
- Injured
- Current redshirt

Roster
Last update: August 29, 2018

== Schedule and results ==
Date time, TV	Rank^{#}	Opponent^{#}	Result	Record	Site (attendance) city, state
Exhibition
Nov 2, 2018*; 7:00 pm		Eureka	W 79–44		Lantz Arena (708); Charleston, IL
Non-conference regular season
Nov 6, 2018*; 7:00 pm, LHN		at Texas	L 59–71	0–1	Frank Erwin Center (7,522); Austin, TX
Nov 10, 2018*; 12:00 pm, ESPN3		at IUPUI	L 65–71	0–2	Indiana Farmers Coliseum (1,350); Indianapolis, IN
Nov 17, 2018*; 7:00 p.m., ESPN+		Western Illinois	W 68–66 ^{OT}	1–2	Lantz Arena (696); Charleston, IL
Nov 23, 2018*; 4:00 p.m.		vs. Gardner–Webb; Battle in the Blue Ridge	W 79–78	2–2	U.S. Cellular Center; Asheville, NC
Nov 24, 2018*; 4:00 p.m.		vs. Arkansas State; Battle in the Blue Ridge	W 90–86 ^{OT}	3–2	U.S. Cellular Center; Asheville, NC
Nov 25, 2018*; 12:00 p.m.		vs. UNC Wilmington; Battle in the Blue Ridge	L 65–82	3–3	U.S. Cellular Center; Asheville, NC
Nov 28, 2018*; 7:00 p.m., ESPN+		Purdue Fort Wayne	L 60–104	3–4	Lantz Arena (1,016); Charleston, IL
Dec 1, 2018*; 2:00 pm		at Chicago State	L 72–80	3–5	Jones Convocation Center (550); Chicago, IL
Dec 4, 2018*; 7:00 p.m., ESPN+		Fontbonne	W 90–37	4–5	Lantz Arena (1,094); Charleston, IL
Dec 8, 2018*; 7:00 pm		at Western Illinois	W 74–67	5–5	Western Hall (522); Macomb, IL
Dec 15, 2018*; 7:00 pm, ESPN3		at Bradley	W 73–66	6–5	Carver Arena (5,186); Peoria, IL
Dec 21, 2018*; 6:00 pm		at Iowa State	L 53–101	6–6	Hilton Coliseum (13,616); Ames, IA
Dec 30, 2018*; 2:00 p.m., ESPN+		North Alabama	W 81–70	7–6	Lantz Arena (1,010); Charleston, IL
Ohio Valley Conference regular season
Jan 3, 2019; 7:30 pm, ESPN+		UT Martin	W 92–87 ^{OT}	8–6 (1–0)	Lantz Arena (1,072); Charleston, IL
Jan 5, 2019; 3:15 pm, ESPN+		SIU Edwardsville	W 84–81 ^{OT}	9–6 (2–0)	Lantz Arena (1,088); Charleston, IL
Jan 10, 2019; 7:15 pm, ESPN+		at Jacksonville State	L 62–69	9–7 (2–1)	Pete Mathews Coliseum (2,275); Jacksonville, AL
Jan 12, 2019; 7:30 pm, ESPN+		at Tennessee Tech	W 67–60	10–7 (3–1)	Eblen Center (3,079); Cookeville, TN
Jan 17, 2019; 7:30 pm, ESPN+		Murray State	L 61–83	10–8 (3–2)	Lantz Arena (2,410); Charleston, IL
Jan 19, 2019; 3:15 pm, ESPN+		Austin Peay	W 85–83	11–8 (4–2)	Lantz Arena (1,111); Charleston, IL
Jan 24, 2019; 7:30 pm, ESPN+		at UT Martin	W 66–64	12–8 (5–2)	Skyhawk Arena (1,094); Martin, TN
Jan 26, 2019; 4:30 pm, ESPN+		at Southeast Missouri State	L 59–64	12–9 (5–3)	Show Me Center (1,636); Cape Girardeau, MO
Jan 31, 2019; 7:30 pm, ESPN+		Eastern Kentucky	W 67–66	13–9 (6–3)	Lantz Arena (1,451); Charleston, IL
Feb 2, 2019; 3:15 pm, ESPN+		Morehead State	L 78–84	13–10 (6–4)	Lantz Arena (1,333); Charleston, IL
Feb 7, 2019; 7:00 pm, ESPN+		at Murray State	L 75–86	13–11 (6–5)	CFSB Center (5,111); Murray, KY
Feb 9, 2019; 3:45 pm, ESPN+		at Austin Peay	L 86–94	13–12 (6–6)	Dunn Center (2,124); Clarksville, TN
Feb 14, 2019; 5:30 pm, ESPN+		at SIU Edwardsville	W 79–65	14–12 (7–6)	Vadalabene Center; Edwardsville, IL
Feb 16, 2019; 3:15 pm, ESPN+		Southeast Missouri State	L 79–88	14–13 (7–7)	Lantz Arena (1,615); Charleston, IL
Feb 21, 2019; 7:00 pm, ESPN+		at Belmont	L 58–99	14–14 (7–8)	Curb Event Center (2,468); Nashville, TN
Feb 23, 2019; 7:30 pm, ESPN+		at Tennessee State	L 60–75	14–15 (7–9)	Gentry Complex (1,511); Nashville, TN
Feb 28, 2019; 7:30 pm, ESPNews		Jacksonville State	L 84–89 ^{2OT}	14–16 (7–10)	Lantz Arena (1,414); Charleston, IL
Mar 2, 2019; 3:15 pm, ESPN+		Tennessee Tech	L 57–63	14–17 (7–11)	Lantz Arena (1,046); Charleston, IL
Ohio Valley tournament
Mar 6, 2019; 8:30, ESPN+	(6)	vs. (7) UT Martin	L 71–78	14–18	Ford Center (643); Evansville, IN
*Non-conference game. ^{#}Rankings from AP Poll. (#) Tournament seedings in parentheses. All times are in Central Time.
