= 2019 Ohio Valley Conference men's basketball tournament =

- Classification: Division I
- Season: 2018–19
- Teams: 8
- Site: Ford Center; Evansville, Indiana
- Champions: Murray State (17th title)
- Winning coach: Matt McMahon (2nd title)
- MVP: Ja Morant (Murray State)
- Top scorer: Ja Morant (Murray State) (55 points)
- Television: ESPN+/ESPN3, ESPNU, ESPN2

2018–19 Ohio Valley Conference men's basketball standings
	Conf.				Overall
Team	W		L	PCT	W		L	PCT
Belmont	16	–	2	.889	27	–	6	.818
Murray State†	16	–	2	.889	28	–	5	.848
Jacksonville State	15	–	3	.833	24	–	9	.727
Austin Peay	13	–	5	.722	22	–	11	.667
Morehead State	8	–	10	.444	13	–	20	.394
Eastern Illinois	7	–	11	.389	14	–	18	.438
UT Martin	6	–	12	.333	12	–	19	.387
SIU Edwardsville	6	–	12	.333	10	–	21	.323
Eastern Kentucky	6	–	12	.333	13	–	18	.419
Tennessee State	6	–	12	.333	9	–	21	.300
Southeast Missouri State	5	–	13	.278	10	–	21	.323
Tennessee Tech	4	–	14	.222	8	–	23	.258
† 2019 OVC tournament winner

The 2019 Ohio Valley Conference men's basketball tournament was the final event of the 2018–19 season in the Ohio Valley Conference. The tournament was held March 6 through March 9, 2019 at the Ford Center in Evansville, Indiana.

The final featured the regular-season co-champions in Belmont and Murray State, with Murray State winning 77–65 and thus earning the conference's automatic bid to the NCAA tournament.

== Seeds ==
Only the top eight teams in the conference qualified for the tournament. Teams are seeded by record within the conference, with a tiebreaker system to seed teams with identical conference records. The No. 1 and No. 2 seeds receive double byes to the semifinals. The No. 3 and No. 4 seeds receive a single bye to the quarterfinals.

Seed	School	Conf.	Tiebreaker
1	Belmont	16–2	1–0 vs. Murray State
2	Murray State	16–2	0–1 vs. Belmont
3	Jacksonville State	15–3	
4	Austin Peay	13–5	
5	Morehead State	8–10	
6	Eastern Illinois	7–11	
7	UT Martin	6–12	Combined 3–2 vs. SIU Edwardsville, EKU, & TSU
8	SIU Edwardsville	6–12	Combined 2–2 vs. UT Martin, EKU, & TSU, 1–0 vs. EKU

== Schedule ==
Game	Time	Matchup	Score	Television
First round – Wednesday, March 6
1	6:30 pm	No. 5 Morehead State vs No. 8 SIU Edwardsville	72–68	ESPN+/ESPN3
2	8:30 pm	No. 6 Eastern Illinois vs No. 7 UT Martin	71–78	ESPN+/ESPN3
Quarterfinals – Thursday, March 7
3	6:30 pm	No. 4 Austin Peay vs No. 5 Morehead State	95–81	ESPN+/ESPN3
4	8:30 pm	No. 3 Jacksonville State vs No. 7 UT Martin	88–81	ESPN+/ESPN3
Semifinals – Friday, March 8
5	7:00 pm	No. 1 Belmont vs No. 4 Austin Peay	83–67	ESPNU
6	9:00 pm	No. 2 Murray State vs No. 3 Jacksonville State	76–74	ESPNU
Championship – Saturday, March 9
7	7:00 pm	No. 1 Belmont vs No. 2 Murray State	65–77	ESPN2
All game times in Central Time Zone.

== Bracket ==
First round Wednesday, March 6 ESPN+/ESPN3
5	Morehead State	72
8	SIU Edwardsville	68
6	Eastern Illinois	71
7	UT Martin	78

Second round Thursday, March 7 ESPN+/ESPN3
4	Austin Peay	95
5	Morehead State	81
3	Jacksonville State	88
7	UT Martin	81

Semifinals; Friday, March 8 ESPNU
1	Belmont	83
4	Austin Peay	67
2	Murray State	76
3	Jacksonville State	74

Championship; Saturday, March 9 ESPN2
1	Belmont	65
2	Murray State	77
