= 2018–19 Ohio Valley Conference men's basketball season =

- League: NCAA Division I
- Sport: Basketball
- Duration: November 2018 through March 2019
- Teams: 10

Regular Season
- Champion: Belmont Bruins
- League champions: Murray State Racers
- Season MVP: Ja Morant

Tournament

Ohio Valley Conference men's basketball seasons
- ← 2017–18 2019–20 →

2018–19 Ohio Valley Conference men's basketball standings
	Conf.				Overall
Team	W		L	PCT	W		L	PCT
Belmont	16	–	2	.889	27	–	6	.818
Murray State†	16	–	2	.889	28	–	5	.848
Jacksonville State	15	–	3	.833	24	–	9	.727
Austin Peay	13	–	5	.722	22	–	11	.667
Morehead State	8	–	10	.444	13	–	20	.394
Eastern Illinois	7	–	11	.389	14	–	18	.438
UT Martin	6	–	12	.333	12	–	19	.387
SIU Edwardsville	6	–	12	.333	10	–	21	.323
Eastern Kentucky	6	–	12	.333	13	–	18	.419
Tennessee State	6	–	12	.333	9	–	21	.300
Southeast Missouri State	5	–	13	.278	10	–	21	.323
Tennessee Tech	4	–	14	.222	8	–	23	.258
† 2019 OVC tournament winner

The 2018–19 Ohio Valley Conference men's basketball season began with practices in October 2018, followed by the start of the 2018–19 NCAA Division I men's basketball season in November. Conference play began in January 2019 and concludes in February 2019. The season marked the 70th season of Ohio Valley Conference basketball.

== Preseason ==
=== Preseason poll ===
Rank	Team
1	Belmont (8)
2	Murray State (9)
3	Jacksonville State (7)
4	Austin Peay
5	Tennessee Tech
6	Eastern Kentucky
7	Eastern Illinois
8	Tennessee State
9	Southeast Missouri State
10	Morehead State
11	UT Martin
12	SIU Edwardsville

() first place votes

=== Preseason All-Conference Teams ===
Award	Recipients
All-Conference Team	Shaq Buchanan (Murray State) Ledarrius Brewer (Southeast Missouri State); Jason Burnell (Jacksonville State); Christian Cunningham (Jacksonville State); Lamontray Harris (Morehead State); Fatood Lewis (UT Martin); Terrell Lewis (Eastern Illinois); Nick Mayo (Eastern Kentucky); Kevin McClain (Belmont); Ja Morant (Murray State); Terry Taylor (Austin Peay); Dylan Windler (Belmont)

OVC Preseason Player of the Year: Dylan Windler (Belmont)
