= Steve Payne (basketball) =

American college basketball coach (born 1968)

Current position
- Title: Assistant coach
- Team: North Texas
- Conference: The American

Biographical details
- Born: February 12, 1968 (age 58)
- Education: Union (KY)

Coaching career (HC unless noted)

Basketball
- 1990–1991: Knox Central HS
- 1991–1994: Union University (asst.)
- 1994–1996: Northwestern State (asst.)
- 1996–2000: Georgetown College (asst.)
- 2000–2002: Frank Phillips College
- 2002–2011: Tennessee Tech (asst.)
- 2011–2019: Tennessee Tech
- 2019–2022: Kansas City (asst.)
- 2022–2024: Cleveland State (Special Asst. to the HC)
- 2024–2025: Cleveland State (asst.)
- 2025–present: North Texas (asst.)

Head coaching record
- Overall: 117–135 (.464)

Accomplishments and honors

Awards
- 118 D1 Wins (4th All-Time in Tennessee Tech History) 2006 Mid-major COY Finalist 2006 CBS OVC COY 2006 College Insider COY 2005 OVC Champion

Steve Payne (born February 12, 1968) is an American college basketball coach. He currently is an assistant coach for the North Texas Mean Green. Most recently he was an assistant coach at Cleveland State. He had previously been the men's basketball coach at Tennessee Technological University in Cookeville, Tennessee, until his resignation following the conclusion of the 2018–2019 season. The Tennessee Tech Golden Eagles are members of the Ohio Valley Conference and compete in the NCAA's Division I. Payne was appointed the head coach at Tennessee Tech on March 23, 2011, following the retirement of Mike Sutton. Payne had been an assistant to Sutton since the 2002–2003 season.

== Head coaching record ==
Record table
Season	Team	Overall	Conference	Standing	Postseason
Tennessee Tech (Ohio Valley Conference) (2011–2019)
2011–12	Tennessee Tech	19–14	9–7	T–4th	CIT First round
2012–13	Tennessee Tech	12–17	5–11	6th (East)	
2013–14	Tennessee Tech	17–16	9–7	4th (East)	
2014–15	Tennessee Tech	12–18	4–12	5th (East)	
2015–16	Tennessee Tech	19–12	11–5	T–2nd (East)	Vegas 16 Quarterfinals
2016–17	Tennessee Tech	12–20	8–8	T–4th (East)	
2017–18	Tennessee Tech	19–14	10–8	T–5th	
2018–19	Tennessee Tech	8–23	4–14	12th	
Tennessee Tech:		118–134 (.468)	60–72 (.455)		
Total:		118–134 (.468)			
National champion Postseason invitational champion Conference regular season champion Conference regular season and conference tournament champion Division regular season champion Division regular season and conference tournament champion Conference tournament champion
