= Brian Collins (basketball) =

American basketball player and coach (born 1984)

Brian Penny Collins
Memphis Grizzlies
- Title: Assistant coach
- League: NBA

Personal information
- Born: March 23, 1984 (age 42) Nashville, Tennessee, U.S.
- Listed height: 6 ft 4 in (1.93 m)
- Listed weight: 175 lb (79 kg)

Career information
- College: Belmont (2002–2006)
- NBA draft: 2006: undrafted
- Playing career: 2006–2007
- Position: Guard
- Coaching career: 2007–present

Career history

Playing
- 2006: Bakersfield Jam
- 2007: Kouvot

Coaching
- 2007–2009: Tennessee State (assistant)
- 2009–2012: Cumberland (assistant)
- 2012–2015: Columbia State CC
- 2015–2017: East Tennessee State (assistant)
- 2017–2018: Illinois State (assistant)
- 2018–2025: Tennessee State
- 2025-present: Memphis Grizzlies (assistant)

Career highlights
- As player: Atlantic Sun All-Freshman team (2003); Atlantic Sun All-Tournament team (2005); As coach: 2013–14 Region 7 Coach of the Year; 2014–15 NJCAA District 7 Coach of the Year; 2019–20 BOXTOROW Coach of the Year; 2024-25 Ben Jobe Award Finalist

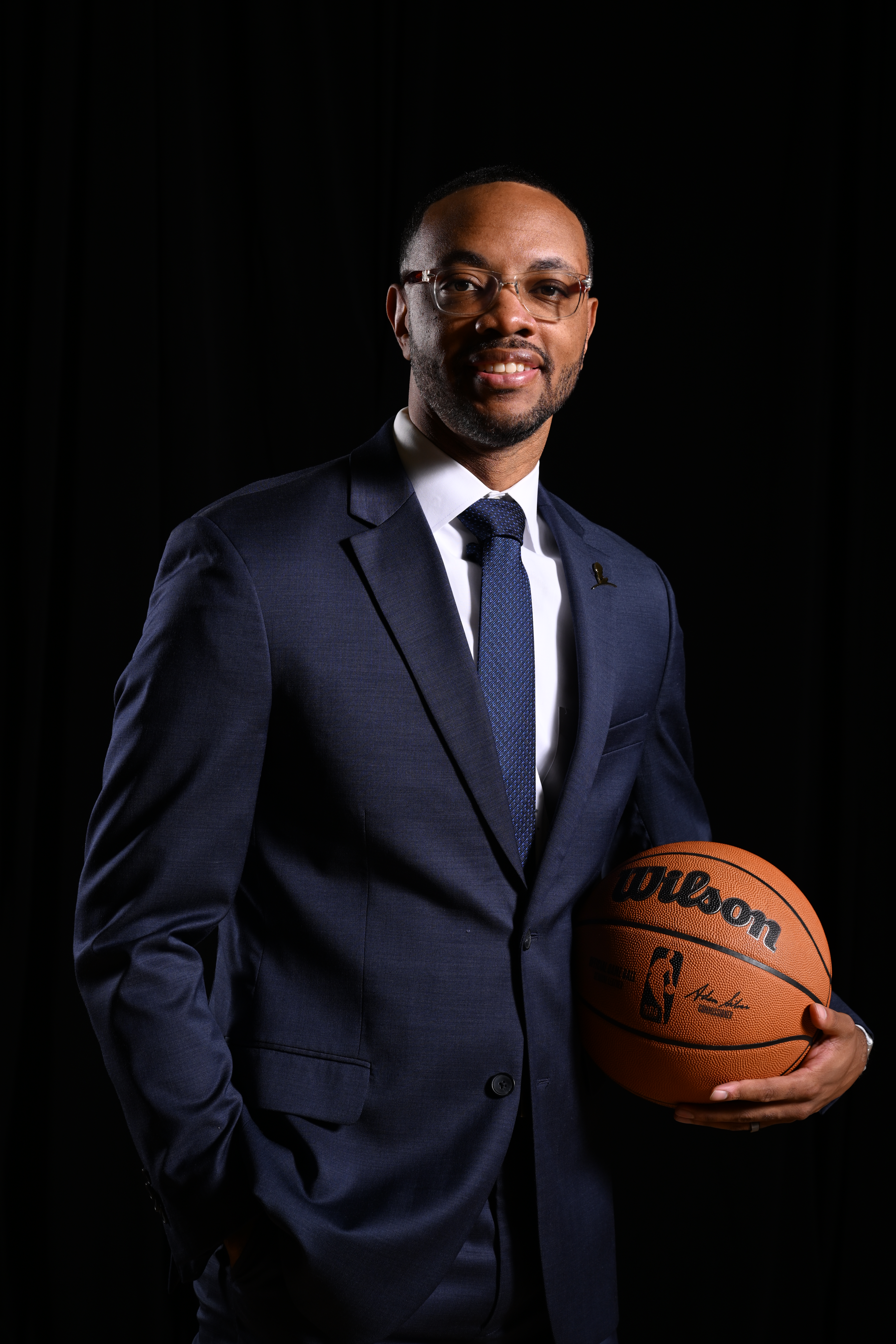

Brian Erick Collins (born March 23, 1984) is an American professional basketball coach who is an assistant coach for the Memphis Grizzlies of the National Basketball Association (NBA). He was previously the head coach at Tennessee State University.

== Playing career ==
A Nashville native, Collins was a four-year starter at hometown Belmont under Rick Byrd, and was the captain of the Bruins first-ever NCAA Tournament appearance at the Division I level in 2006. He scored 1,199 points in his career, and left the school as the all-time leader in assists and steals at the Division I level.

After graduation, Collins played professional basketball between 2006 and 2007 with the Bakersfield Jam of the NBDL and Kouvot in Finland.

== Coaching career ==
In 2007, Collins began his coaching career serving as a graduate assistant and director of basketball operations at Tennessee State until 2009, when he accepted an assistant coaching position at NAIA institution Cumberland.

Collins landed his first head coaching job, taking the reins of Columbia State where he took over a team that went 10–17 in his first year, but compiled a 54–11 overall record in his final two seasons and led the team to two-straight NCJAA national tournament appearances. After the 2015 season, Collins joined the staff at ETSU for two seasons before spending one season at Illinois St. as an assistant coach.

Collins was named head coach of Tennessee State University in 2018, leading a turnaround of the program during his seven-year tenure. He became the only coach in the Division I era at TSU to record three consecutive 18-win and finished as the second-winningest coach in program history.

In 2020, Collins was named BOXTOROW National Coach of the Year and was also a finalist for the Ben Jobe Award in 2020 and 2025. His program emphasized player development and academic success, producing over 30 professional players and achieving a 100% graduation rate during his tenure.

Collins increased the program’s national visibility, hosting Tennessee State’s first NBA Pro Day in his second season, which drew scouts from more than 15 teams from the National Basketball Association. That same year, TSU recorded the largest increase in attendance in Division I basketball, along with record-setting season ticket sales.

In his fourth season, Collins founded the “Deserve 2 Win” Celebrity Weekend, a fundraising initiative that generated the highest revenue in program history and contributed to facility enhancements.

On June 30, 2025, Tennessee State announced that Collins had stepped down for a coaching role in the NBA. His move was described as a historic and rare transition, as it involved a sitting HBCU head coach moving directly to an NBA coaching staff. Collins then accepted a position as an assistant for the Memphis Grizzlies.

== Head coaching record ==
=== NJCAA ===
Record table
Season	Team	Overall	Conference	Standing	Postseason
Columbia State () (2012–2015)
2012–13	Columbia State	10–17 *	7–11 *	N/A	
2013–14	Columbia State	28–4	17–1	N/A	ELITE 8
2014–15	Columbia State	26–7	14–4	N/A	SWEET 16
Columbia State:		64–28 (.696)	38–16 (.704)		
Total:		64–28 (.696)			
National champion Postseason invitational champion Conference regular season champion Conference regular season and conference tournament champion Division regular season champion Division regular season and conference tournament champion Conference tournament champion

=== NCAA DI ===
Record table
Season	Team	Overall	Conference	Standing	Postseason
Tennessee State (Ohio Valley) (2018–2025)
2018–19	Tennessee State	9–21	6–12	T-8th	
2019–20	Tennessee State	18–15	9–9	T–5th	
2020–21	Tennessee State	4–19	3–17	12th	
2021–22	Tennessee State	14–18	8–10	T–5th	
2022–23	Tennessee State	18–14	10–8	T–3rd	
2023–24	Tennessee State	18–15	10–8	5th	
2024–25	Tennessee State	17–16	12–8	T–3rd	
Tennessee State:		98–118 (.454)	58–72 (.446)		
Total:		98–118 (.454)			
National champion Postseason invitational champion Conference regular season champion Conference regular season and conference tournament champion Division regular season champion Division regular season and conference tournament champion Conference tournament champion
