= 2018–19 Eastern Kentucky Colonels men's basketball team =

American college basketball season

2018–19 Eastern Kentucky Colonels men's basketball
- Conference: Ohio Valley Conference
- Record: 13–18 (6–12 OVC)
- Head coach: A. W. Hamilton (1st season)
- Assistant coaches: Steve Lepore; Mike Allen; Reece Gaines
- Home arena: McBrayer Arena

2018–19 Ohio Valley Conference men's basketball standings
	Conf.				Overall
Team	W		L	PCT	W		L	PCT
Belmont	16	–	2	.889	27	–	6	.818
Murray State†	16	–	2	.889	28	–	5	.848
Jacksonville State	15	–	3	.833	24	–	9	.727
Austin Peay	13	–	5	.722	22	–	11	.667
Morehead State	8	–	10	.444	13	–	20	.394
Eastern Illinois	7	–	11	.389	14	–	18	.438
UT Martin	6	–	12	.333	12	–	19	.387
SIU Edwardsville	6	–	12	.333	10	–	21	.323
Eastern Kentucky	6	–	12	.333	13	–	18	.419
Tennessee State	6	–	12	.333	9	–	21	.300
Southeast Missouri State	5	–	13	.278	10	–	21	.323
Tennessee Tech	4	–	14	.222	8	–	23	.258
† 2019 OVC tournament winner

The 2018–19 Eastern Kentucky Colonels men's basketball team represented Eastern Kentucky University during the 2018–19 NCAA Division I men's basketball season. The Colonels, led by first-year head coach A. W. Hamilton, played their home games at McBrayer Arena within Alumni Coliseum as members of the Ohio Valley Conference. They finished the season 13–18 overall, 6–12 in OVC play, finishing in a four-way tie for sixth place. Tiebreakers worked against them, so they failed to qualify to play in the OVC tournament for the fourth consecutive season.

== Previous season ==
The Colonels finished the season 11–20, 5–13 in OVC play to finish in a three-way tie for ninth place. They failed to make the OVC tournament for the third consecutive season.

On February 26, 2018, the school fired Dan McHale as head coach after three seasons. He finished at EKU with a three-year record of 38–55. On March 23, NC State assistant A.W. Hamilton was hired as the new head coach of the Colonels.

== Roster ==
2018–19 Eastern Kentucky Colonels men's basketball team
Players
Coaches

Pos.	#	Name	Height	Weight	Year	Hometown
G	0	Dujuanta Weaver	5 ft 10 in (1.78 m)	170 lb (77 kg)	RS Jr	Louisville, Kentucky
G	1	JacQuess Hobbs	6 ft 2 in (1.88 m)	180 lb (82 kg)	So	Louisville, Kentucky
F	2	Jordon Oakley	6 ft 5 in (1.96 m)	210 lb (95 kg)	Jr	La Plata, Maryland
G	3	Peyton Broughton	6 ft 5 in (1.96 m)	195 lb (88 kg)	So	London, Kentucky
G	4	Kelvin Robinson	6 ft 2 in (1.88 m)	210 lb (95 kg)	RS Jr	Little Rock, Arkansas
F	5	Darius Hicks	6 ft 8 in (2.03 m)	235 lb (107 kg)	RS So	Quitman, Mississippi
F	10	Nick Mayo	6 ft 9 in (2.06 m)	250 lb (113 kg)	Sr	Oakland, Maine
G	11	Jomaru Brown	6 ft 2 in (1.88 m)	185 lb (84 kg)	Fr	Raleigh, North Carolina
F	12	Tre King	6 ft 8 in (2.03 m)	225 lb (102 kg)	Fr	Lexington, Kentucky
G	14	Houston King	6 ft 4 in (1.93 m)	180 lb (82 kg)	RS Fr	Toledo, Ohio
G	15	Kirkland Humphrey	6 ft 0 in (1.83 m)	170 lb (77 kg)	Sr	Richmond, Kentucky
F	21	Lachlan Anderson	6 ft 8 in (2.03 m)	205 lb (93 kg)	Jr	Sydney, Australia
G	23	Cameron Carmical	5 ft 10 in (1.78 m)	160 lb (73 kg)	So	Harlan, Kentucky
G	25	Mason Cooper	6 ft 2 in (1.88 m)	175 lb (79 kg)	RS Fr	Fairfield, Maine
F	32	Pedro Bradshaw	6 ft 7 in (2.01 m)	170 lb (77 kg)	RS Fr	Russellville, Kentucky

Head coach

- A. W. Hamilton (Marshall)

Assistant coach(es)

- Steve Lepore (Wake Forest)
- Mike Allen (Ohio)
- Reece Gaines (Louisville)

Legend

- (C) Team captain
- (S) Suspended
- (I) Ineligible
- (W) Walk-on
- Injured
- Current redshirt

Roster
Last update: August 30, 2018

== Schedule and results ==
Date time, TV	Opponent	Result	Record	Site (attendance) city, state
Exhibition
Nov 1, 2018*; 7:00 pm	Kentucky Christian	W 136–92		McBrayer Arena (1,800); Richmond, KY
Non-conference regular season
Nov 7, 2018*; 7:00 pm, ESPN+	Marshall	L 77–105	0–1	McBrayer Arena (5,189); Richmond, KY
Nov 10, 2018*; 7:00 pm	at Chattanooga	W 81–78	1–1	McKenzie Arena (2,568); Chattanooga, TN
Nov 13, 2018*; 7:00 pm, ESPN+	Midway	W 107–52	2–1	McBrayer Arena (2,280); Richmond, KY
Nov 16, 2018*; 7:30 pm	vs. No. 12 Kansas State; Paradise Jam quarterfinals	L 68–95	2–2	Sports and Fitness Center (2,162); Saint Thomas, USVI
Nov 17, 2018*; 5:00 pm, FloSports.tv	vs. Northern Iowa; Paradise Jam consolation 2nd round	L 85–90	2–3	Sports and Fitness Center (1,253); Saint Thomas, USVI
Nov 19, 2018*; 1:00 pm	vs. Kennesaw State; Paradise Jam 7th place game	W 100–81	3–3	Sports and Fitness Center (886); Saint Thomas, USVI
Nov 28, 2018*; 7:30 pm, SECN	at No. 6 Tennessee	L 67–95	3–4	Thompson–Boling Arena (15,036); Knoxville, TN
Dec 1, 2018*; 2:00 pm, ESPN+	at High Point	W 70–69	4–4	Millis Center (1,492); High Point, NC
Dec 5, 2018*; 7:30 pm, ESPN+	USC Upstate	W 79–77	5–4	McBrayer Arena (2,640); Richmond, KY
Dec 8, 2018*; 6:00 pm, ESPN+	Northern Kentucky	W 76–74	6–4	McBrayer Arena (3,035); Richmond, KY
Dec 15, 2018*; 8:00 pm, FS1	at Xavier	L 77–95	6–5	Cintas Center (10,112); Cincinnati, OH
Dec 22, 2018*; 2:00 pm, ESPN+	at Duquesne	W 85–84 ^{OT}	6–6	Palumbo Center (1,421); Pittsburgh, PA
Dec 29, 2018*; 6:00 pm, ESPN+	Brescia	W 145–72	7–6	McBrayer Arena (1,589); Richmond, KY
Ohio Valley Conference regular season
Jan 3, 2019; 9:00 pm, ESPN+	at Austin Peay	L 75–93	7–7 (0–1)	Dunn Center (1,393); Clarksville, TN
Jan 5, 2019; 8:00 pm, ESPN+	at Murray State	L 85–97	7–8 (0–2)	CFSB Center (6,552); Murray, KY
Jan 10, 2019; 8:30 pm, ESPN+	at Tennessee State	L 81–82	7–9 (0–3)	Gentry Complex (411); Nashville, TN
Jan 12, 2019; 6:00 pm, ESPN+	at Belmont	L 93–109	7–10 (0–4)	Curb Event Center (2,282); Nashville, TN
Jan 17, 2019; 7:00 pm, ESPN+	UT Martin	W 97–73	8–10 (1–4)	McBrayer Arena (1,803); Richmond, KY
Jan 19, 2019; 7:00 pm, ESPN+	Southeast Missouri State	W 85–83	9–10 (2–4)	McBrayer Arena (1,860); Richmond, KY
Jan 24, 2019; 7:00 pm, ESPN+	Jacksonville State	W 88–70	10–10 (3–4)	Seabury Center (1,280); Berea, KY
Jan 26, 2019; 7:00 pm, ESPN+	Tennessee Tech	L 85–91	10–11 (3–5)	Davis-Reid Alumni Gym (1,410); Georgetown, KY
Jan 31, 2019; 8:30 pm, ESPN+	at Eastern Illinois	L 66–67	10–12 (3–6)	Lantz Arena (1,451); Charleston, IL
Feb 2, 2019; 8:00 pm, ESPN+	at SIU Edwardsville	L 82–88	10–13 (3–7)	Vadalabene Center (1,060); Edwardsville, IL
Feb 7, 2019; 7:00 pm, ESPN+	Belmont	L 65–83	10–14 (3–8)	McBrayer Arena (1,620); Richmond, KY
Feb 9, 2019; 7:00 pm, ESPN+	Tennessee State	W 75–65	11–14 (4–8)	McBrayer Arena (1,640); Richmond, KY
Feb 14, 2019; 7:30 pm, ESPN+	at Morehead State	L 72–78	11–15 (4–9)	Ellis Johnson Arena (2,023); Morehead, KY
Feb 16, 2019; 7:00 pm, ESPN+	Murray State	L 70–102	11–16 (4–10)	McBrayer Arena (5,640); Richmond, KY
Feb 21, 2019; 8:30 pm	at Tennessee Tech	W 67–66	12–16 (5–10)	Eblen Center (1,536); Cookeville, TN
Feb 23, 2019; 5:00 pm, ESPN+	at Jacksonville State	L 101–104 ^{2OT}	12–17 (5–11)	Pete Mathews Coliseum (2,423); Jacksonville, AL
Feb 28, 2019; 7:00 pm, ESPN+	Austin Peay	W 82–80	13–17 (6–11)	McBrayer Arena (1,640); Richmond, KY
Mar 2, 2019; 7:00 pm, ESPN+	Morehead State	L 77–78	13–18 (6–12)	McBrayer Arena (3,226); Richmond, KY
*Non-conference game. ^{#}Rankings from AP Poll. (#) Tournament seedings in parentheses. All times are in Eastern Time.
