= 2018–19 Morehead State Eagles men's basketball team =

American college basketball season

2018–19 Morehead State Eagles men's basketball
- Conference: Ohio Valley Conference
- Record: 13–20 (8–10 OVC)
- Head coach: Preston Spradlin (2nd season)
- Assistant coaches: Jonathan Mattox; Dominic Lombardi; Scott Combs
- Home arena: Ellis Johnson Arena

2018–19 Ohio Valley Conference men's basketball standings
	Conf.				Overall
Team	W		L	PCT	W		L	PCT
Belmont	16	–	2	.889	27	–	6	.818
Murray State†	16	–	2	.889	28	–	5	.848
Jacksonville State	15	–	3	.833	24	–	9	.727
Austin Peay	13	–	5	.722	22	–	11	.667
Morehead State	8	–	10	.444	13	–	20	.394
Eastern Illinois	7	–	11	.389	14	–	18	.438
UT Martin	6	–	12	.333	12	–	19	.387
SIU Edwardsville	6	–	12	.333	10	–	21	.323
Eastern Kentucky	6	–	12	.333	13	–	18	.419
Tennessee State	6	–	12	.333	9	–	21	.300
Southeast Missouri State	5	–	13	.278	10	–	21	.323
Tennessee Tech	4	–	14	.222	8	–	23	.258
† 2019 OVC tournament winner

The 2018–19 Morehead State Eagles men's basketball team represented Morehead State University during the 2018–19 NCAA Division I men's basketball season. The Eagles, led by second-year head coach Preston Spradlin, played their home games at Ellis Johnson Arena in Morehead, Kentucky as members of the Ohio Valley Conference. They finished the season 13–20, 8–10 in OVC play to finish in fifth place. They defeated SIU Edwardsville in the first round of the OVC tournament before losing in the quarterfinals to Austin Peay.

== Previous season ==
The Eagles finished the 2017–18 season 8–21, 4–14 in OVC play to finish in last place. They failed to qualify for the OVC tournament.

== Roster ==
2018–19 Morehead State Eagles men's basketball team
Players
Coaches

Pos.	#	Name	Height	Weight	Year	Previous school	Hometown
G	0	A.J. Hicks	6 ft 0 in (1.83 m)	185 lb (84 kg)	Sr	Meadowcreek HS; Columbia State CC	Norcross, GA
F	1	De'Von Cooper	6 ft 4 in (1.93 m)	190 lb (86 kg)	So	Waggener HS	Louisville, KY
G	2	Jordan Walker	6 ft 0 in (1.83 m)	185 lb (84 kg)	Jr	Cathedral HS	Indianapolis, IN
F	3	James Baker	6 ft 6 in (1.98 m)	195 lb (88 kg)	So	Meade County HS	Brandenburg, KY
G	4	Tada Stricklen	6 ft 0 in (1.83 m)	190 lb (86 kg)	Fr	Corinth HS	Corinth, MS
F	10	Alonzo Chatman	6 ft 7 in (2.01 m)	215 lb (98 kg)	Jr	Morgan Park HS	Chicago, IL
G	11	Richard Feagin, Jr.	6 ft 0 in (1.83 m)	160 lb (73 kg)	So	Southfield Christian School	Detroit, MI
F	12	Malek Green	6 ft 7 in (2.01 m)	216 lb (98 kg)	So	Taft HS	Cincinnati, OH
F	13	Lamontray Harris	6 ft 7 in (2.01 m)	220 lb (100 kg)	Sr	Pleasure Ridge Park HS; Robinson Prep	Louisville, KY
G	20	Malik Shabazz	6 ft 2 in (1.88 m)	170 lb (77 kg)	Fr	Evangel Christian School	Louisville, KY
G	23	Malik Riddle	6 ft 4 in (1.93 m)	175 lb (79 kg)	Fr	Rossville Christian Academy	Holly Springs, MS
G	32	Djimon Henson	6 ft 3 in (1.91 m)	195 lb (88 kg)	Jr	Lawrence North HS	Indianapolis, IN
F	33	Sasha Sukhanov	6 ft 11 in (2.11 m)	235 lb (107 kg)	Fr	Teays Valley Christian HS	Tomsk, Russia
F	34	Ja'Cori Wilson	6 ft 7 in (2.01 m)	200 lb (91 kg)	RS Fr	South Paulding HS; NW Florida State	Atlanta, GA

Head coach

- Preston Spradlin (Alice Lloyd)

Assistant coach(es)

- Jonathan Mattox (Emmanuel)
- Dominic Lombardi (Indiana–Pennsylvania)
- Scott Combs (Austin Peay)

Legend

- (C) Team captain
- (S) Suspended
- (I) Ineligible
- (W) Walk-on
- Injured
- Current redshirt

Roster
Last update: September 27, 2018

== Schedule and results ==
Date time, TV	Rank^{#}	Opponent^{#}	Result	Record	Site (attendance) city, state
Exhibition
Oct 25, 2018*; 6:00 pm		Berea	W 98–47		Ellis Johnson Arena (1,258); Morehead, KY
Non-conference regular season
Nov 6, 2018*; 6:00 pm, ESPN+		Kentucky Christian	W 102–82	1–0	Ellis Johnson Arena (1,255); Morehead, KY
Nov 8, 2018*; 7:00 pm, SNY		at UConn; 2K Sports Classic	L 70–80	1–1	Harry A. Gampel Pavilion (10,167); Storrs, CT
Nov 10, 2018*; 7:00 pm, ACCN Extra		at No. 16 Syracuse; 2K Sports Classic	L 70–84	1–2	Carrier Dome (21,012); Syracuse, NY
Nov 16, 2018*; 5:30 pm		vs. UMKC; 2K Sports Classic regional semifinals	W 99–89	2–2	Reese Court (166); Cheney, WA
Nov 17, 2018*; 4:05 pm		vs. Green Bay; 2K Sports Classic regional final	L 70–87	2–3	Reese Court; Cheney, WA
Nov 25, 2018*; 2:00 pm, ESPN+		Lipscomb	L 55–87	2–4	Ellis Johnson Arena (1,555); Morehead, KY
Nov 27, 2018*; 7:30 pm, ESPN+		Northern Kentucky	L 71–93	2–5	Ellis Johnson Arena (2,874); Morehead, KY
Nov 30, 2018*; 11:00 am, ESPN+		Ohio–Chillicothe	W 103–50	3–5	Ellis Johnson Arena (3,864); Morehead, KY
Dec 10, 2018*; 7:00 pm, ESPN+		at Marshall	L 64–76	3–6	Cam Henderson Center (6,253); Huntington, WV
Dec 13, 2018*; 7:30 pm, ESPN+		at Samford	L 72–77 ^{OT}	3–7	Pete Hanna Center (1,172); Homewood, AL
Dec 18, 2018*; 7:00 pm, ESPN+		at Wright State	L 67–78	3–8	Nutter Center (3,133); Fairborn, OH
Dec 21, 2018*; 5:30 pm, ESPN+		IUPUI	W 74–70	4–8	Ellis Johnson Arena (2,874); Morehead, KY
Dec 29, 2018*; 2:00 pm, SECN		at Missouri	W 75–61	4–9	Mizzou Arena (11,458); Columbia, MO
Ohio Valley Conference regular season
Jan 3, 2019; 8:00 pm, ESPN+		at Murray State	L 69–90	4–10 (0–1)	CFSB Center (4,006); Murray, KY
Jan 5, 2019; 5:00 pm, ESPN+		at Austin Peay	L 67–81	4–11 (0–2)	Dunn Center (1,552); Clarksville, TN
Jan 10, 2019; 7:30 pm, ESPN+		at Belmont	L 60–77	4–12 (0–3)	Curb Event Center (1,704); Nashville, TN
Jan 12, 2019; 8:30 pm, ESPN+		at Tennessee State	W 74–61	5–12 (1–3)	Gentry Complex (653); Nashville, TN
Jan 17, 2019; 7:30 pm, ESPN+		Southeast Missouri State	W 73–69	6–12 (2–3)	Ellis Johnson Arena (2,024); Murray, KY
Jan 19, 2019; 6:30 pm, ESPN+		UT Martin	W 85–77	7–12 (3–3)	Ellis Johnson Arena (2,234); Murray, KY
Jan 24, 2019; 7:30 pm, ESPN+		Tennessee Tech	W 67–61	8–12 (4–3)	Ellis Johnson Arena (2,088); Murray, KY
Jan 26, 2019; 3:30 pm, ESPN+		Jacksonville State	L 71–77	8–13 (4–4)	Ellis Johnson Arena (2,147); Murray, KY
Jan 31, 2019; 8:00 pm, ESPN+		at SIU Edwardsville	L 76–83	8–14 (4–5)	Vadalabene Center (1,079); Edwardsville, IL
Feb 2, 2019; 4:15 ppm, ESPN+		at Eastern Illinois	W 84–78	9–14 (5–5)	Lantz Arena (1,333); Charleston, IL
Feb 7, 2019; 7:30 pm, ESPN+		Tennessee State	L 80–81 ^{OT}	9–15 (5–6)	Ellis Johnson Arena (2,066); Murray, KY
Feb 9, 2019; 4:30 pm, ESPN+		Belmont	L 86–96	9–16 (5–7)	Ellis Johnson Arena (2,077); Murray, KY
Feb 14, 2019; 7:30 pm, ESPN+		Eastern Kentucky	W 78–72	10–16 (6–7)	Ellis Johnson Arena (2,023); Murray, KY
Feb 16, 2019; 4:30 pm, ESPN+		Austin Peay	L 70–73	10–17 (6–8)	Ellis Johnson Arena (2,282); Murray, KY
Feb 21, 2019; 8:15 pm, ESPN+		at Jacksonville State	L 64–65	10–18 (6–9)	Pete Mathews Coliseum (2,134); Jacksonville, AL
Feb 23, 2019; 8:30 pm, ESPN+		at Tennessee Tech	W 66–63	11–18 (7–9)	Eblen Center (1,949); Cookeville, TN
Feb 28, 2019; 7:30 pm, ESPN+		Murray State	L 52–71	11–19 (7–10)	Ellis Johnson Arena (6,071); Murray, KY
Mar 2, 2019; 7:00 pm, ESPN+		at Eastern Kentucky	W 78–77	12–19 (8–10)	McBrayer Arena (3,226); Richmond, KY
Ohio Valley tournament
Mar 6, 2019; 6:30 pm, ESPN+	(5)	vs. (8) SIU Edwardsville; First round	W 72–68	13–19	Ford Center; Evansville, IN
Mar 7, 2019; 6:30 pm, ESPN+	(5)	vs. (4) Austin Peay; Quarterfinals	L 81–95	13–20	Ford Center; Evansville, IN
*Non-conference game. (#) Tournament seedings in parentheses. All times are in Eastern Time.
