= Kathleen and Tom Elam Center =

Sports and recreation facility in Tennessee

- Skyhawk Arena
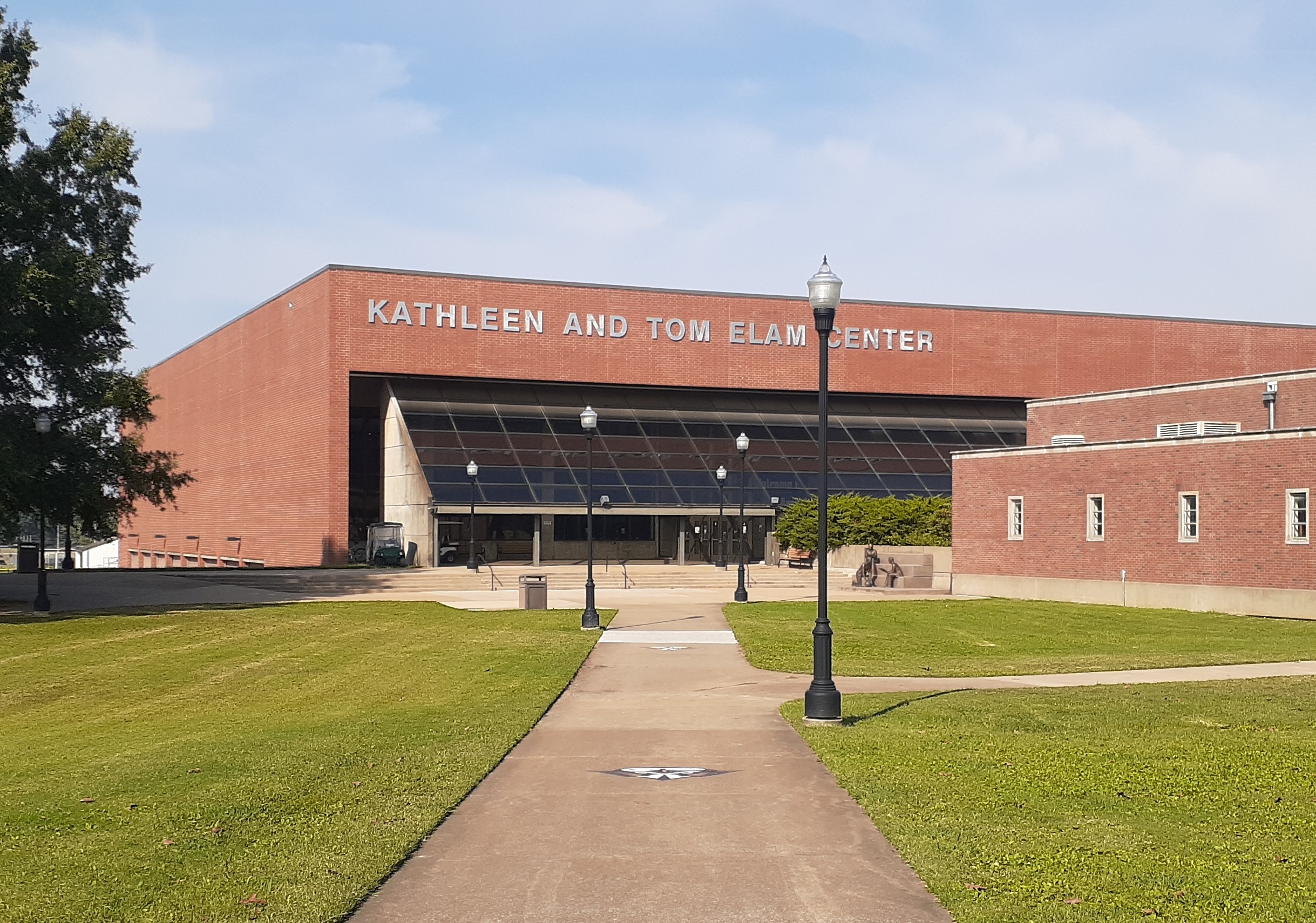
- Interactive map of Kathleen and Tom Elam Center
- Location: 95 Mt Pelia Rd, Martin, TN 38237
- Coordinates: 36.343604°N 88.868134°W
- Owner: University of Tennessee at Martin
- Operator: University of Tennessee at Martin
- Capacity: 4,300
- Surface: Multi-surface

Construction
- Built: 1962
- Opened: 1963
- Construction cost: $6,336,181

Tenants
- UT Martin Skyhawks (NCAA) (1963–present)

Website
- Kathleen and Tom Elam Center

The Kathleen and Tom Elam Center is a multi-purpose sports and recreation facility on the campus of the University of Tennessee at Martin (UTM) named in honor of University of Tennessee Trustee Col. Tom Elam and his wife, Kathleen. Col. Elam, of nearby Union City, Tennessee, was the long-time chairman of the Athletics Committee of the University of Tennessee Board of Trustees. The Elam Center houses the UTM Intercollegiate Athletics and the Department of Health and Human Performance. It features seven basketball courts with volleyball and badminton options, seven racquetball courts, an Olympic-sized swimming pool, an equipment check-out area, a weight room, an interior jogging balcony, an aerobics room, and Skyhawk Arena.

Skyhawk Arena is a 4,300-seat multi-purpose arena located inside the Elam Center that is the home court for the Skyhawks men's and women's basketball teams. The playing floor is named for UTM alumna Pat Summitt. The building was originally opened in 1963 as the Physical Education & Convocation Center, replacing the college's Physical Education Building, built in 1930, and originally sat 3,500 until a 1973-75 renovation and addition brought it to its current size and form. The UT Martin men's basketball team began playing its home games inside the Elam Center (then branded as Pacer Stadium) during the 1978-79 season. At the time, it was the eighth-largest on-campus facility in the nation (7,000 seats) amongst NCAA Division II institutions. It received its current name in 1994.

== See also ==
- List of NCAA Division I basketball arenas
