= 2019–20 Ohio Valley Conference men's basketball season =

2018–19 Ohio Valley Conference men's basketball season
- League: NCAA Division I
- Sport: Basketball
- Duration: November 5, 2019–March 7, 2020
- Teams: 12
- TV partner(s): ESPN2, ESPNU, ESPN+
- Season MVP: Terry Taylor

Tournament

Ohio Valley Conference men's basketball seasons
- ← 2018–19 2020–21 →

2019–20 Ohio Valley Conference men's basketball standings
	Conf.				Overall
Team	W		L	PCT	W		L	PCT
Belmont †	15	–	3	.833	26	–	7	.788
Murray State	15	–	3	.833	23	–	9	.719
Austin Peay	14	–	4	.778	21	–	12	.636
Eastern Kentucky	12	–	6	.667	16	–	17	.485
Tennessee State	9	–	9	.500	18	–	15	.545
Eastern Illinois	9	–	9	.500	17	–	15	.531
Jacksonville State	8	–	10	.444	13	–	19	.406
Morehead State	7	–	11	.389	13	–	19	.406
Tennessee Tech	6	–	12	.333	9	–	22	.290
UT Martin	5	–	13	.278	9	–	20	.310
SIU Edwardsville	5	–	13	.278	8	–	23	.258
Southeast Missouri State	3	–	15	.167	7	–	24	.226
† 2020 OVC tournament winner

The 2019–20 Ohio Valley Conference men's basketball season was the 71st season of Ohio Valley Conference men's basketball. It began with practices in October 2018, followed by the start of the 2019–20 NCAA Division I men's basketball season on November 5, 2019. Conference play began January 2, 2019 and concluded on February 29, 2020. The 2020 Ohio Valley Conference men's basketball tournament was held March 4–7 at the Ford Center in Evansville, Indiana.

== Preseason ==
=== Preseason Poll ===
The 2019 preseason poll was determined at the conference's media day on October 22, 2019, at the Ford Center in Evansville, Indiana.

Rank	Team
1	Belmont
2	Murray State
3	Jacksonville State
4	Austin Peay
5	UT Martin
6	Eastern Kentucky
7	Eastern Illinois
8	Morehead State
9	Tennessee State
10	SIU Edwardsville
11	Southeast Missouri State
12	Tennessee Tech

=== Preseason All-OVC Team ===
The pre-season all-OVC team was also selected at media day. The first player in bold is the preseason player of the year.

Player	School
**Terry Taylor**	**Austin Peay**
Grayson Murphy	Belmont
Nick Muszynski	Belmont
Josiah Wallace	Eastern Illinois
Jomaru Brown	Eastern Kentucky
Jordan Walker	Morehead State
Tevin Brown	Murray State
J.R. Clay	Tennessee Tech
Quintin Dove	UT Martin
Craig Randall II	UT Martin

== All-Conference Teams and Awards ==
Award	Recipients
Player of the Year	Terry Taylor (Austin Peay)
Coach of the Year	A. W. Hamilton (Eastern Kentucky)
Freshman of the Year	Jordyn Adams (Austin Peay)
Defensive Player of the Year	Grayson Murphy (Belmont)
First Team	Terry Taylor (Austin Peay) Tevin Brown (Murray State); Grayson Murphy (Belmont); Jomaru Brown (Eastern Kentucky); Nick Muszynski (Belmont); Jordyn Adams (Austin Peay); Josiah Wallace (Eastern Illinois); Quintin Dove (UT Martin); Adam Kunkel (Belmont); KJ Williams (Murray State)
Second Team	Carlos Marshall Jr. (Tennessee State) Parker Stewart (UT Martin); Jr. Clay (Tennessee Tech); Jacara Cross (Jacksonville State); Tre King (Eastern Kentucky); Mack Smith (Eastern Illinois)
All-Newcomer Team	Jordyn Adams (Austin Peay) Parker Stewart (UT Martin); George Dixon (Eastern Illinois); Carlos Marshall Jr. (Tennessee State); Kayne Henry (Jacksonville State)
