= 2019–20 Austin Peay Governors basketball team =

American college basketball season

2019–20 Austin Peay Governors basketball
- Conference: Ohio Valley Conference
- Record: 21–12 (14–4 OVC)
- Head coach: Matt Figger (3rd season)
- Assistant coaches: Darryl Dora; Nikita Johnson; Sergio Rouco
- Home arena: Dunn Center

2019–20 Ohio Valley Conference men's basketball standings
	Conf.				Overall
Team	W		L	PCT	W		L	PCT
Belmont †	15	–	3	.833	26	–	7	.788
Murray State	15	–	3	.833	23	–	9	.719
Austin Peay	14	–	4	.778	21	–	12	.636
Eastern Kentucky	12	–	6	.667	16	–	17	.485
Tennessee State	9	–	9	.500	18	–	15	.545
Eastern Illinois	9	–	9	.500	17	–	15	.531
Jacksonville State	8	–	10	.444	13	–	19	.406
Morehead State	7	–	11	.389	13	–	19	.406
Tennessee Tech	6	–	12	.333	9	–	22	.290
UT Martin	5	–	13	.278	9	–	20	.310
SIU Edwardsville	5	–	13	.278	8	–	23	.258
Southeast Missouri State	3	–	15	.167	7	–	24	.226
† 2020 OVC tournament winner

The 2019–20 Austin Peay Governors basketball team represented Austin Peay State University in the 2019–20 NCAA Division I men's basketball season. The Governors, led by third-year head coach Matt Figger, played their home games at the Dunn Center in Clarksville, Tennessee as members of the Ohio Valley Conference. They finished the season 21–12, 14–4 in OVC play to finish in third place. They defeated Eastern Illinois in the quarterfinals of the OVC tournament to advance to the semifinals where they lost to Murray State. With 21 wins, they were a candidate for postseason play. However, all postseason tournaments were cancelled amid the COVID-19 pandemic.

== Previous season ==
The Governors finished the 2018–19 season 22–11 overall, 13–5 in OVC play to finish in fourth place. In the OVC tournament, they defeated Morehead State in the quarterfinals before losing to Belmont in the semifinals.

== Roster ==
2019–20 Austin Peay Governors men's basketball team
Players
Coaches

Pos.	#	Name	Height	Weight	Year	Hometown
G/F	0	Evan Hinson	6 ft 4 in (1.93 m)	235 lb (107 kg)	Sr	Deltona, Florida
G	1	Carlos Paez	5 ft 10 in (1.78 m)	180 lb (82 kg)	Fr	Naguanagua, Venezuela
G	2	Codey Bates	6 ft 2 in (1.88 m)	195 lb (88 kg)	Fr	Memphis, Tennessee
G	3	Devon McCain	6 ft 3 in (1.91 m)	190 lb (86 kg)	Fr	Silsbee, Texas
G	4	Antwuan Butler	6 ft 0 in (1.83 m)	195 lb (88 kg)	So	Philadelphia, Pennsylvania
G	5	Jordyn Adams	6 ft 3 in (1.91 m)	200 lb (91 kg)	Fr	Silsbee, Texas
F	10	Pavle Djurisic	6 ft 8 in (2.03 m)	225 lb (102 kg)	Fr	Podgorica, Montenegro
F	11	Sita Conteh	6 ft 8 in (2.03 m)	195 lb (88 kg)	Jr	Bronx, New York
G	12	Reginald Gee	6 ft 3 in (1.91 m)	220 lb (100 kg)	GS	Houston, Texas
G/F	14	Eli Abaev	6 ft 8 in (2.03 m)	210 lb (95 kg)	RS Jr	Deerfield Beach, Florida
G/F	21	Terry Taylor	6 ft 5 in (1.96 m)	230 lb (104 kg)	Jr	Bowling Green, Kentucky
G	22	Alec Woodard	6 ft 2 in (1.88 m)	200 lb (91 kg)	Fr	Rutledge, Georgia
C	24	Matheus Silveira	7 ft 0 in (2.13 m)	255 lb (116 kg)	So	Três Pontas, Brazil
F	41	Sam DeVault	6 ft 10 in (2.08 m)	220 lb (100 kg)	Fr	Evansville, Indiana

Head coach

- Matt Figger (Eastern Kentucky)

Assistant coach(es)

- Darryl Dora (Texas Tech)
- Nikita Johnson (West Georgia)
- Sergio Rouco (Nova Southeastern)

Legend

- (C) Team captain
- (S) Suspended
- (I) Ineligible
- (W) Walk-on
- Injured
- Current redshirt

Roster
Last update: December 3, 2019

== Schedule and results ==
Date time, TV	Rank^{#}	Opponent^{#}	Result	Record	Site (attendance) city, state
Exhibition
October 24, 2019*; 7:00 pm, ESPN+		Union (TN)	W 99–95		Dunn Center (571); Clarksville, TN
November 2, 2019*; 7:00 pm, ESPN+		Lees–McRae	W 106–67		Dunn Center (509); Clarksville, TN
Non-conference regular season
November 5, 2019*; 7:30 pm, ESPN+		Oakland City	W 110–67	1–0	Dunn Center (1,360); Clarksville, TN
November 9, 2019*; 3:00 pm, ESPN3		at Western Kentucky	L 75–97	1–1	E. A. Diddle Arena (4,907); Bowling Green, KY
November 16, 2019*; 2:00 pm, ESPN3		at Tulsa; Vanderbilt Invitational	L 65–72	1–2	Reynolds Center (3,105); Tulsa, OK
November 20, 2019*; 7:00 pm, SECN+		at Vanderbilt; Vanderbilt Invitational	L 72–90	1–3	Memorial Gymnasium (8,732); Nashville, TN
November 23, 2019*; 7:00 pm, ESPN+		Southeastern Louisiana; Vanderbilt Invitational	W 81–60	2–3	Dunn Center (980); Clarksville, TN
November 25, 2019*; 7:00 pm, ESPN+		South Carolina State; Vanderbilt Invitational	W 92–66	3–3	Dunn Center (1,027); Clarksville, TN
December 3, 2019*; 7:00 pm, SECN+		at Arkansas	L 61–69	3–4	Bud Walton Arena (11,995); Fayetteville, AR
December 7, 2019*; 4:00 pm, ESPN+		North Florida	W 90–83	4–4	Dunn Center (817); Clarksville, TN
December 12, 2019*; 6:00 pm, Nexstar		at West Virginia	L 53–84	4–5	WVU Coliseum (9,987); Morgantown, WV
December 17, 2019*; 7:00 pm, ESPN+		McKendree	W 80–61	5–5	Dunn Center (724); Clarksville, TN
December 21, 2019*; 1:30 pm		vs. Duquesne; St. Pete Shootout	L 77–86	5–6	McArthur Center (204); St. Petersburg, FL
December 22, 2019*; 11:00 am		vs. Alabama State; St. Pete Shootout	W 80–69	6–6	McArthur Center (181); St. Petersburg, FL
December 30, 2019*; 7:00 pm, SEC+		at Georgia	L 48–78	6–7	Stegeman Coliseum (9,800); Athens, GA
Ohio Valley regular season
January 2, 2020; 8:00 pm, ESPN+		Southeast Missouri State	W 78–63	7–7 (1–0)	Dunn Center (917); Clarksville, TN
January 4, 2020; 4:00 pm, ESPN+		UT Martin	W 82–63	8–7 (2–0)	Dunn Center (1,028); Clarksville, TN
January 9, 2020; 6:00 pm, ESPN+		at Tennessee Tech	W 75–62	9–7 (3–0)	Eblen Center (2,032); Cookeville, TN
January 11, 2020; 4:00 pm, ESPN+		at Jacksonville State	W 71–67	10–7 (4–0)	Pete Mathews Coliseum (969); Jacksonville, AL
January 16, 2020; 7:15 pm, ESPN+		at Southeast Missouri State	W 84–59	11–7 (5–0)	Show Me Center (989); Cape Girardeau, MO
January 18, 2020; 4:00 pm, ESPN+		at UT Martin	W 92–81	12–7 (6–0)	Skyhawk Arena (1,392); Martin, TN
January 23, 2020; 8:00 pm, ESPN+		Tennessee State	W 99–74	13–7 (7–0)	Dunn Center (2,033); Clarksville, TN
January 25, 2020; 8:00 pm, ESPN+		Belmont	W 86–78	14–7 (8–0)	Dunn Center (2,429); Clarksville, TN
January 30, 2020; 8:00 pm, ESPN+		SIU Edwardsville	W 82–58	15–7 (9–0)	Dunn Center (1,729); Clarksville, TN
February 1, 2020; 4:00 pm, ESPN+		Eastern Illinois	W 68–64	16–7 (10–0)	Dunn Center (2,128); Clarksville, TN
February 6, 2020; 7:30 pm, ESPN3		at Tennessee State	L 68–70	16–8 (10–1)	Gentry Complex (3,872); Nashville, TN
February 8, 2020; 5:00 pm, ESPN+		at Belmont	L 63–71	16–9 (10–2)	Curb Event Center (2,898); Nashville, TN
February 13, 2020; 8:00 pm, ESPNU		Murray State	W 71–68	17–9 (11–2)	Dunn Center (4,052); Clarksville, TN
February 15, 2020; 4:30 pm, ESPN+		Eastern Kentucky	W 93–85	18–9 (12–2)	Dunn Center (1,851); Clarksville, TN
February 20, 2020; 8:00 pm, ESPN+		at SIU Edwardsville	W 78–60	19–9 (13–2)	Vadalabene Center (568); Edwardsville, IL
February 22, 2020; 6:00 pm, ESPN+		at Eastern Illinois	L 80–83 ^{OT}	19–10 (13–3)	Lantz Arena (1,633); Charleston, IL
February 27, 2020; 8:00 pm, ESPN+		Morehead State	W 67–58	20–10 (14–3)	Dunn Center (1,931); Clarksville, TN
February 29, 2020; 7:30 pm, ESPN+		at Murray State	L 61–75	20–11 (14–4)	CFSB Center (8,229); Murray, KY
Ohio Valley Conference tournament
March 5, 2020; 8:30 pm, ESPN+	(3)	vs. (6) Eastern Illinois; Quarterfinals	W 76–65	21–11	Ford Center (1,005); Evansville, IN
March 6, 2020; 9:00 pm, ESPNU	(3)	vs. (2) Murray State; Semifinals	L 61–73	21–12	Ford Center (3,435); Evansville, IN
*Non-conference game. ^{#}Rankings from AP Poll. (#) Tournament seedings in parentheses. All times are in Central.
