= 2019–20 Eastern Kentucky Colonels men's basketball team =

American college basketball season

2019–20 Eastern Kentucky Colonels men's basketball
- Conference: Ohio Valley Conference
- Record: 16–17 (12–6 OVC)
- Head coach: A. W. Hamilton (2nd season)
- Assistant coaches: Steve Lepore; Mike Allen; Reece Gaines
- Home arena: McBrayer Arena

2019–20 Ohio Valley Conference men's basketball standings
	Conf.				Overall
Team	W		L	PCT	W		L	PCT
Belmont †	15	–	3	.833	26	–	7	.788
Murray State	15	–	3	.833	23	–	9	.719
Austin Peay	14	–	4	.778	21	–	12	.636
Eastern Kentucky	12	–	6	.667	16	–	17	.485
Tennessee State	9	–	9	.500	18	–	15	.545
Eastern Illinois	9	–	9	.500	17	–	15	.531
Jacksonville State	8	–	10	.444	13	–	19	.406
Morehead State	7	–	11	.389	13	–	19	.406
Tennessee Tech	6	–	12	.333	9	–	22	.290
UT Martin	5	–	13	.278	9	–	20	.310
SIU Edwardsville	5	–	13	.278	8	–	23	.258
Southeast Missouri State	3	–	15	.167	7	–	24	.226
† 2020 OVC tournament winner

The 2019–20 Eastern Kentucky Colonels men's basketball team represented Eastern Kentucky University during the 2019–20 NCAA Division I men's basketball season. The Colonels, led by second-year head coach A. W. Hamilton, played their home games at McBrayer Arena within Alumni Coliseum as members of the Ohio Valley Conference. They finished the season 16–17, 12–6 in OVC play to finish in fourth place. They defeated Tennessee State in the quarterfinals before losing to Belmont in the semifinals.

== Previous season ==
The Colonels finished the season 2018–19 season 13–18, 6–12 in OVC play to finish in a four-way tie for sixth place. Due to tie-breaking rules, they failed to qualify to play in the OVC tournament for the fourth consecutive season.

== Roster ==
2019–20 Eastern Kentucky Colonels men's basketball team
Players
Coaches

Pos.	#	Name	Height	Weight	Year	Hometown
G	0	Russhard Cruickshank	6 ft 0 in (1.83 m)	175 lb (79 kg)	Jr	Milwaukee, Wisconsin
G	1	JacQuess Hobbs	6 ft 2 in (1.88 m)	180 lb (82 kg)	Jr	Louisville, Kentucky
F	2	Tre King	6 ft 8 in (2.03 m)	225 lb (102 kg)	So	Lexington, Kentucky
G	3	Peyton Broughton	6 ft 5 in (1.96 m)	195 lb (88 kg)	Jr	London, Kentucky
G	4	Curt Lewis	6 ft 4 in (1.93 m)	200 lb (91 kg)	Fr	Louisville, Kentucky
F	5	Darius Hicks	6 ft 8 in (2.03 m)	235 lb (107 kg)	RS Jr	Quitman, Mississippi
G	11	Jomaru Brown	6 ft 2 in (1.88 m)	185 lb (84 kg)	So	Raleigh, North Carolina
G	12	Ty Taylor	6 ft 2 in (1.88 m)	175 lb (79 kg)	RS Sr	Grandview, Missouri
F	13	Tariq Balogun	6 ft 9 in (2.06 m)	200 lb (91 kg)	Fr	Charlottesville, Virginia
G	14	Houston King	6 ft 4 in (1.93 m)	180 lb (82 kg)	RS So	Toledo, Ohio
G	20	Isaiah Minter	5 ft 11 in (1.8 m)	170 lb (77 kg)	RS Fr	Richmond, Kentucky
F	21	Lachlan Anderson	6 ft 8 in (2.03 m)	205 lb (93 kg)	Sr	Sydney, Australia
G	23	Cameron Carmical	5 ft 10 in (1.78 m)	160 lb (73 kg)	Jr	Harlan, Kentucky
F	24	Michael Moreno	6 ft 6 in (1.98 m)	200 lb (91 kg)	Fr	Georgetown, Kentucky
G	25	Mason Cooper	6 ft 2 in (1.88 m)	175 lb (79 kg)	RS So	Fairfield, Maine
G	30	Jordan Reeves-Young	6 ft 3 in (1.91 m)	170 lb (77 kg)	Fr	Brooklyn, New York

Head coach

- A. W. Hamilton (Marshall)

Assistant coach(es)

- Steve Lepore (Wake Forest)
- Mike Allen (Ohio)
- Reece Gaines (Louisville)

Legend

- (C) Team captain
- (S) Suspended
- (I) Ineligible
- (W) Walk-on
- Injured
- Current redshirt

Roster
Last update: August 30, 2018

== Schedule and results ==
Date time, TV	Rank^{#}	Opponent^{#}	Result	Record	High points	High rebounds	High assists	Site (attendance) city, state
Exhibition
October 31, 2019*; 7:00 pm		Berea	W 113–63	–	19 – Anderson/Brown	11 – Anderson	7 – Cruickshank	McBrayer Arena (1,834); Richmond, KY
Regular season
November 5, 2019*; 7:00 pm, ESPN+		Chattanooga	W 79–68	1–0	19 – King	12 – Hicks	4 – Cruickshank	McBrayer Arena (2,858); Richmond, KY
November 8, 2019*; 7:00 pm, SECN		at No. 2 Kentucky	L 49–91	1–1	14 – Moreno	7 – Hobbs	5 – Hobbs	Rupp Arena (20,163); Lexington, KY
November 12, 2019*; 7:00 pm, ESPN+		Ohio–Chillicothe	W 129–43	2–1	22 – Brown	13 – Moreno	6 – Cruickshank	McBrayer Arena (1,464); Richmond, KY
November 15, 2019*; 7:00 pm, ESPN+		Western Kentucky	L 71–79	2–2	41 – Brown	7 – Hicks	2 – 3 tied	McBrayer Arena (5,826); Richmond, KY
November 19, 2019*; 7:00 pm, ESPN+		Alice Lloyd	W 99–63	3–2	18 – Taylor	11 – Hicks	5 – 3 tied	McBrayer Arena (1,783); Richmond, KY
November 22, 2019*; 3:30 pm		vs. FIU; Battle for the Capital	L 70–89	3–3	19 – Tied	9 – Hicks	4 – Cruickshank	Entertainment and Sports Arena (512); Washington, D.C.
November 23, 2019*; 3:30 pm		vs. Cleveland State; Battle for the Capital	L 51–65	3–4	15 – Brown	15 – Hicks	3 – Hobbs	Entertainment and Sports Arena (739); Washington, D.C.
December 3, 2019*; 6:00 pm, ESPN+		at USC Upstate	L 67–79	3–5	17 – Brown	9 – King	3 – Taylor	G.B. Hodge Center (568); Spartanburg, SC
December 8, 2019*; 7:00 pm, FS Ohio		at Northern Kentucky	L 57–76	3–6	14 – Taylor	6 – Hicks	5 – Hobbs	BB&T Arena (3,199); Highland Heights, KY
December 14, 2019*; 12:00 pm, ACCN		at Louisville	L 67–99	3–7	13 – Taylor	5 – King	6 – Brown	KFC Yum! Center (16,185); Louisville, KY
December 19, 2019*; 7:00 pm, ESPN3		at Marshall	L 72–90	3–8	15 – King	10 – Brown	3 – Brown	Cam Henderson Center (5,057); Huntington, WV
December 21, 2019*; 7:00 pm, ESPN+		Charleston Southern	L 69–76	3–9	20 – Taylor	11 – Moreno	3 – Hobbs	McBrayer Arena (1,707); Richmond, KY
December 28, 2019*; 4:00 pm, ESPN3		at East Carolina	L 74–82	3–10	25 – Brown	12 – King	6 – Hobbs	Williams Arena (3,481); Greenville, NC
Ohio Valley Conference regular season
January 2, 2020; 7:30 pm, ESPN+		Tennessee Tech	W 74–59	4–10 (1–0)	15 – King	5 – Tied	8 – Hobbs	McBrayer Arena (1,814); Richmond, KY
January 4, 2020; 4:00 pm, ESPN+		Jacksonville State	L 71–80	4–11 (1–1)	18 – Brown	7 – Moreno	3 – Tied	McBrayer Arena (1,719); Richmond, KY
January 9, 2020; 7:30 pm, ESPN+		Eastern Illinois	W 77–74	5–11 (2–1)	24 – Brown	9 – Moreno	2 – Tied	McBrayer Arena (1,517); Richmond, KY
January 11, 2020; 4:00 pm, ESPN+		SIU Edwardsville	W 78–72	6–11 (3–1)	20 – Brown	9 – Anderson	9 – Cruickshank	McBrayer Arena (1,767); Richmond, KY
January 16, 2020; 9:00 pm, ESPNU		at Belmont	L 56–87	6–12 (3–2)	25 – Brown	7 – Taylor	4 – Brown	Curb Event Center (1,736); Nashville, TN
January 18, 2020; 5:00 pm, ESPN+		at Tennessee State	W 92–88	7–12 (4–2)	37 – Brown	7 – Moreno	4 – Tied	Gentry Complex (3,982); Nashville, TN
January 23, 2020; 7:30 pm, ESPN+		at Jacksonville State	W 81–77	8–12 (5–2)	24 – Brown	9 – King	3 – Cruickshank	Pete Mathews Coliseum (1,046); Jacksonville, AL
January 25, 2020; 7:30 pm, ESPN+		at Tennessee Tech	W 80–74	9–12 (6–2)	31 – Brown	6 – Tied	9 – Hobbs	Eblen Center (2,051); Cookeville, TN
January 30, 2020; 7:30 pm, ESPN+		UT Martin	W 99–86	10–12 (7–2)	27 – Taylor	8 – Moreno	6 – Cruickshank	McBrayer Arena (2,373); Richmond, KY
February 1, 2020; 7:30 pm, ESPN+		Southeast Missouri State	W 70–57	11–12 (8–2)	10 – Anderson	8 – Moreno	5 – Brown	McBrayer Arena (2,937); Richmond, KY
February 6, 2020; 4:30 pm, ESPN+		at Eastern Illinois	W 91–84	12–12 (9–2)	22 – King	7 – Tied	3 – 4 tied	Lantz Arena (1,400); Charleston, IL
February 8, 2020; 4:30 pm, ESPN+		at SIU Edwardsville	L 75–83	12–13 (9–3)	21 – Brown	11 – Moreno	6 – Brown	Vadalabene Center (840); Edwardsville, IL
February 13, 2020; 7:00 pm, ESPN+		at Morehead State	W 78–71	13–13 (10–3)	19 – Brown	7 – Anderson	9 – Brown	Ellis Johnson Arena (2,933); Morehead, KY
February 15, 2020; 5:30 pm, ESPN+		at Austin Peay	L 85–93	13–14 (10–4)	21 – King	8 – Anderson	1 – 4 tied	Dunn Center (1,851); Clarksville, TN
February 20, 2020; 7:30 pm, ESPN+		Tennessee State	W 83–62	14–14 (11–4)	22 – Taylor II	7 – King	5 – Moreno	McBrayer Arena (2,975); Richmond, KY
February 22, 2020; 7:00 pm, ESPN+		Belmont	L 70–83	14–15 (11–5)	15 – Anderson	10 – Moreno	4 – Moreno	McBrayer Arena (2,658); Richmond, KY
February 27, 2020; 8:00 pm, ESPN+		at Murray State	L 62–74	14–16 (11–6)	24 – Brown	10 – Anderson	2 – Brown	CFSB Center (5,727); Murray, KY
February 29, 2020; 7:00 pm, ESPN+		Morehead State	W 80–76	15–16 (12–6)	17 – Brown	8 – Moreno	3 – Brown	McBrayer Arena (3,249); Richmond, KY
Ohio Valley tournament
Mar 5, 2020; 6:30 pm, ESPN+	(4)	vs. (5) Tennessee State; Quarterfinals	W 58–48	16–16	12 – Brown	8 – Moreno	2 – Tied	Ford Center (1,005); Evansville, IN
Mar 6, 2020; 7:00 pm, ESPNU	(4)	vs. (1) Belmont; Semifinals	L 50–60	16–17	15 – Cruickshank	9 – Brown	2 – Brown	Ford Center (3,435); Evansville, IN
*Non-conference game. ^{#}Rankings from AP Poll. (#) Tournament seedings in parentheses. All times are in Eastern Time.
