= 2019–20 Southeast Missouri State Redhawks men's basketball team =

American college basketball season

2019–20 Southeast Missouri State Redhawks men's basketball
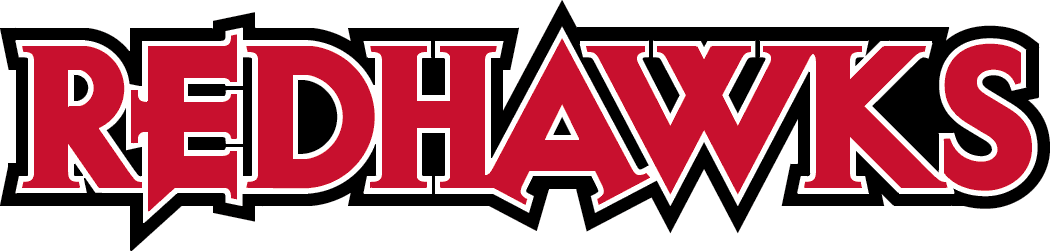
- Conference: Ohio Valley Conference
- Record: 7–24 (3–15 OVC)
- Head coach: Rick Ray (5th season)
- Assistant coaches: Keith Pickens; Tarrance Crump; Jason Owens
- Home arena: Show Me Center

2019–20 Ohio Valley Conference men's basketball standings
	Conf.				Overall
Team	W		L	PCT	W		L	PCT
Belmont †	15	–	3	.833	26	–	7	.788
Murray State	15	–	3	.833	23	–	9	.719
Austin Peay	14	–	4	.778	21	–	12	.636
Eastern Kentucky	12	–	6	.667	16	–	17	.485
Tennessee State	9	–	9	.500	18	–	15	.545
Eastern Illinois	9	–	9	.500	17	–	15	.531
Jacksonville State	8	–	10	.444	13	–	19	.406
Morehead State	7	–	11	.389	13	–	19	.406
Tennessee Tech	6	–	12	.333	9	–	22	.290
UT Martin	5	–	13	.278	9	–	20	.310
SIU Edwardsville	5	–	13	.278	8	–	23	.258
Southeast Missouri State	3	–	15	.167	7	–	24	.226
† 2020 OVC tournament winner

The 2019–20 Southeast Missouri State Redhawks men's basketball team represented Southeast Missouri State University in the 2019–20 NCAA Division I men's basketball season. The Redhawks, led by fifth-year head coach Rick Ray, played their home games at the Show Me Center in Cape Girardeau, Missouri as members of the Ohio Valley Conference. They finished the season 7–24, 3–15 in OVC play to finish in last place. They failed to qualify for the OVC tournament.

On March 3, head coach Rick Ray was fired. He finished at Southeast Missouri State with a five-year record of 51–104. On March 23, the school named former Kansas State assistant coach Brad Korn the new head coach.

== Previous season ==
The Redhawks finished the 2018–19 season 10–21 overall, 5–13 in OVC play, finishing in 11th place. Only the top eight teams can play in the OVC tournament, so the Redhawks did not qualify this season.

== Roster ==
2019–20 Southeast Missouri State Redhawks men's basketball team
Players
Coaches

Pos.	#	Name	Height	Weight	Year	Hometown
G	0	Alex Caldwell	6 ft 0 in (1.83 m)	160 lb (73 kg)	So	Columbia, South Carolina
G	1	Khalil Cuffee	6 ft 4 in (1.93 m)	205 lb (93 kg)	RS So	Fairburn, Georgia
G	2	Jordan Love	6 ft 5 in (1.96 m)	180 lb (82 kg)	RS Fr	Durham, North Carolina
G	3	Skyler Hogan	6 ft 5 in (1.96 m)	205 lb (93 kg)	RS Sr	Melbourne, Florida
G	4	Oscar Kao	6 ft 0 in (1.83 m)	170 lb (77 kg)	Jr	Taipei, Taiwan
G	5	Chris Harris	6 ft 3 in (1.91 m)	205 lb (93 kg)	Jr	Antioch, Illinois
F	10	Quatarrius Wilson	6 ft 8 in (2.03 m)	215 lb (98 kg)	Sr	Mobile, Alabama
G	11	DQ Nicholas	6 ft 1 in (1.85 m)	180 lb (82 kg)	Fr	Atlanta, Georgia
F	12	Evan Morrison	6 ft 6 in (1.98 m)	190 lb (86 kg)	Jr	Lee's Summit, Missouri
F	13	Isaiah Gable	6 ft 7 in (2.01 m)	200 lb (91 kg)	Jr	Greenville, Ohio
G	15	Nana Akenten	6 ft 6 in (1.98 m)	215 lb (98 kg)	Jr	Bolingbrook, Illinois
G	20	Jakob Medina	6 ft 2 in (1.88 m)	175 lb (79 kg)	Fr	Chicago, Illinois
F	23	Sage Tolbert	6 ft 8 in (2.03 m)	210 lb (95 kg)	So	Richmond, Texas
G	25	Nygal Russell	6 ft 4 in (1.93 m)	205 lb (93 kg)	So	Houston, Texas
F	44	Darrious Agnew	6 ft 8 in (2.03 m)	220 lb (100 kg)	Jr	Starkville, Mississippi

Head coach

- Rick Ray (Grand View College)

Assistant coach(es)

- Keith Pickens (Missouri State)
- Tarrance Crump (Purdue)
- Jason Owens (Siena Heights)

Legend

- (C) Team captain
- (S) Suspended
- (I) Ineligible
- (W) Walk-on
- Injured
- Current redshirt

Roster
Last update: December 3, 2019

== Schedule and results ==
Date time, TV	Opponent	Result	Record	Site (attendance) city, state
Exhibition
November 2, 2019*; 6:30 pm	Lincoln	W 73–56		Show Me Center (652); Cape Girardeau, MO
Non-conference regular season
November 6, 2019*; 7:00 pm, SECN+	at Vanderbilt	L 65–83	0–1	Memorial Gymnasium (8,097); Nashville, TN
November 10, 2019*; 4:00 pm, ESPN+	Purdue Fort Wayne	W 79–78	1–1	Show Me Center (1,685); Cape Girardeau, MO
November 19, 2019*; 6:30 pm, ESPN+	The Citadel	L 69–74	1–2	Show Me Center (1,087); Cape Girardeau, MO
November 22, 2019*; 6:30 pm, ESPN+	Missouri S&T	W 72–71	2–2	Show Me Center (721); Cape Girardeau, MO
November 27, 2019*; 6:30 pm	vs. Cal State Fullerton; Cable Car Classic	L 57–64	2–3	Leavey Center (912); Santa Clara, CA
November 29, 2019*; 4:00 pm	at Santa Clara; Cable Car Classic	L 75–87	2–4	Leavey Center (1,009); Santa Clara, CA
November 30, 2019*; 3:00 pm	vs. Denver; Cable Car Classic	W 66–51	3–4	Leavey Center (993); Santa Clara, CA
December 5, 2019*; 7:30 pm, ESPN+	at Abilene Christian	L 64–73	3–5	Moody Coliseum (1,982); Abilene, TX
December 7, 2019*; 5:00 pm, ESPN+	at Drake	L 73–78	3–6	Knapp Center (2,723); Des Moines, IA
December 15, 2019*; 7:00 pm, ESPN+	at Youngstown State	L 50–65	3–7	Beeghly Center (1,243); Youngstown, OH
December 17, 2019*; 6:00 pm, BTN	at No. 5 Ohio State	L 48–80	3–8	Value City Arena (13,177); Columbus, OH
December 21, 2019*; 3:00 pm, ESPN3	at Southern Illinois	L 45–64	3–9	Banterra Center (4,293); Carbondale, IL
December 29, 2019*; 4:00 pm, ESPN+	Missouri Baptist	W 74–59	4–9	Show Me Center (1,001); Cape Girardeau, MO
Ohio Valley regular season
January 2, 2020; 8:00 pm, ESPN+	at Austin Peay	L 63–78	4–10 (0–1)	Dunn Center (9–17); Clarksville, TN
January 4, 2020; 7:00 pm, ESPN+	at Murray State	L 59–81	4–11 (0–2)	CFSB Center (4,125); Murray, KY
January 9, 2020; 7:15 pm, ESPN+	Belmont	L 64–89	4–12 (0–3)	Show Me Center (1,097); Cape Girardeau, MO
January 11, 2020; 4:00 pm, ESPN+	Tennessee State	L 73–75	4–13 (0–4)	Show Me Center (1,012); Cape Girardeau, MO
January 16, 2020; 7:15 pm, ESPN+	Austin Peay	L 59–84	4–14 (0–5)	Show Me Center (989); Cape Girardeau, MO
January 18, 2020; 4:00 pm, ESPN+	Murray State	L 91–96 ^{OT}	4–15 (0–6)	Show Me Center (1,784); Cape Girardeau, MO
January 23, 2020; 7:30 pm, ESPN+	at SIU Edwardsville	L 65–84	4–16 (0–7)	Vadalabene Center (655); Edwardsville, IL
January 25, 2020; 3:15 pm, ESPN+	at Eastern Illinois	L 59–61	4–17 (0–8)	Lantz Arena (1,538); Charleston, IL
January 30, 2020; 6:00 pm, ESPN+	at Morehead State	L 74–90	4–18 (0–9)	Ellis Johnson Arena (2,092); Morehead, KY
February 1, 2020; 3:00 pm, ESPN+	at Eastern Kentucky	L 57–70	4–19 (0–10)	McBrayer Arena (2,937); Richmond, KY
February 6, 2020; 7:15 pm, ESPN+	Jacksonville State	W 76–72	5–19 (1–10)	Show Me Center (1,256); Cape Girardeau, MO
February 8, 2020; 4:00 pm, ESPN+	Tennessee Tech	L 60–62	5–20 (1–11)	Show Me Center (1,486); Cape Girardeau, MO
February 13, 2020; 7:15 pm, ESPN+	UT Martin	W 74–72	6–20 (2–11)	Show Me Center (1,076); Cape Girardeau, MO
February 15, 2020; 4:00 pm, ESPN+	SIU Edwardsville	W 75–71	7–20 (3–11)	Show Me Center (1,678); Cape Girardeau, MO
February 20, 2020; 7:30 pm, ESPN+	at Jacksonville State	L 58–65	7–21 (3–12)	Pete Mathews Coliseum (1,256); Jacksonville, AL
February 22, 2020; 4:00 pm, ESPN+	at Tennessee Tech	L 62–71	7–22 (3–13)	Eblen Center (1,847); Cookeville, TN
February 27, 2020; 7:15 pm, ESPN+	Eastern Illinois	L 70–72	7–23 (3–14)	Show Me Center (1,775); Cape Girardeau, MO
February 29, 2020; 4:00 pm, ESPN+	at UT Martin	L 78–87	7–24 (3–15)	Skyhawk Arena (1,204); Martin, TN
*Non-conference game. ^{#}Rankings from AP Poll. (#) Tournament seedings in parentheses. All times are in Central.
