= Casey Alexander =

American basketball player and coach

Current position
- Title: Head coach
- Team: Kansas State
- Conference: Big 12
- Record: 3–1 (.750)

Biographical details
- Born: June 8, 1972 (age 54); Chattanooga, Tennessee, U.S.

Playing career
- 1991–1995: Belmont

Coaching career (HC unless noted)
- 1995–2011: Belmont (assistant)
- 2011–2013: Stetson
- 2013–2019: Lipscomb
- 2019–2026: Belmont
- 2026–present: Kansas State

Head coaching record
- Overall: 306–181 (.628)
- Tournaments: 0–1 (NCAA); 4–2 (NIT)

Accomplishments and honors

Championships
- A-Sun tournament (2018); ASUN regular season (2019); 2× OVC regular season (2020, 2021); OVC tournament (2020); MVC regular season (2026)

Awards
- Skip Prosser Man of the Year Award (2018); ASUN Coach of the Year (2019); MVC Coach of the Year (2026)

Casey Alexander (born June 8, 1972) is an American college basketball coach who is currently the head coach of the Kansas State Wildcats men's basketball team. He previously served as head coach at Stetson University, Lipscomb University, and Belmont University.

== Playing career ==
Alexander played college basketball as a point guard at Belmont University from 1991–1995 while the program was part of the NAIA. He was named to the Belmont University Athletic Hall of Fame in 2005 in recognition of his accomplishments as a player.

== Coaching career ==
=== Assistant coach (1995–2011) ===
Immediately after graduation, Alexander joined the Belmont coaching staff under Rick Byrd, where he stayed for 16 seasons. He was a part of a coaching staff that reached four NCAA Tournaments.

=== Stetson (2011–2013) ===
In 2011, Alexander was announced as the head coach at Stetson University. He guided the Hatters to a 24–36 record in two seasons before departing the school.

=== Lipscomb (2013–2019) ===
On May 18, 2013, Alexander was named the head coach of Lipscomb University, one of Stetson's rivals in the Atlantic Sun Conference. During his tenure at Lipscomb, Alexander coached the Bisons to their first-ever appearance in the NCAA Division I men's basketball tournament in 2018 and an appearance in the 2019 NIT championship game. In his final season at Lipscomb, he led the Bisons to a program-record 29 wins.

While coaching at Lipscomb, Alexander was the 2018 recipient of the Skip Prosser Man of the Year Award and the Atlantic Sun Conference Men's Basketball Coach of the Year in 2019.

=== Belmont (2019–2026) ===
On April 10, 2019, Alexander returned to Belmont University when he became the head coach at his alma mater following former head coach Rick Byrd's decision to retire after 33 seasons. While coaching at Belmont, Alexander led the Bruins to a 166–60 record and three regular season conference championships, though the team never appeared in the NCAA tournament during his tenure.

=== Kansas State (2026–present) ===
On March 13, 2026, Alexander agreed to become the next head coach of Kansas State University.

== Head coaching record ==
Record table
Season	Team	Overall	Conference	Standing	Postseason
Stetson Hatters (Atlantic Sun Conference) (2011–2013)
2011–12	Stetson	9–20	6–12	8th	
2012–13	Stetson	15–16	11–7	3rd	
Stetson:		24–36 (.400)	17–19 (.472)		
Lipscomb Bisons (Atlantic Sun Conference) (2013–2019)
2013–14	Lipscomb	15–15	10–8	5th	
2014–15	Lipscomb	14–17	7–7	T–4th	
2015–16	Lipscomb	12–21	7–7	T–6th	
2016–17	Lipscomb	20–13	11–3	2nd	
2017–18	Lipscomb	23–10	10–4	2nd	NCAA Division I First Round
2018–19	Lipscomb	29–8	14–2	T–1st	NIT Runner-up
Lipscomb:		113–84 (.574)	59–31 (.656)		
Belmont Bruins (Ohio Valley Conference) (2019–2021)
2019–20	Belmont	26–7	15–3	T–1st	NCAA Division I canceled
2020–21	Belmont	26–4	18–2	1st	
2021–22	Belmont	25–8	15–3	2nd	NIT First Round
Belmont Bruins (Missouri Valley Conference) (2022–2026)
2022–23	Belmont	21–11	14–6	T–3rd	
2023–24	Belmont	20–13	12–8	T–4th	
2024–25	Belmont	22–11	13–7	4th	
2025–26	Belmont	26–6	16–4	1st	
Belmont:		166–60 (.735)	102–33 (.756)		
Kansas State Wildcats (Big 12 Conference) (2026–present)
2026–27	Kansas State	3–1	0–0		
Kansas State:		3–1 (.750)	0–0 (–)		
Total:		306–181 (.628)			
National champion Postseason invitational champion Conference regular season champion Conference regular season and conference tournament champion Division regular season champion Division regular season and conference tournament champion Conference tournament champion

== Personal life ==
Alexander is married to Sunni Alexander, a fellow Belmont alum. They are the parents of three children: Allie, Reed, and Mason.
