= 2019–20 Tennessee Tech Golden Eagles men's basketball team =

American college basketball season

2019–20 Tennessee Tech Golden Eagles men's basketball
- Conference: Ohio Valley Conference
- East Division
- Record: 9–22 (6–12 OVC)
- Head coach: John Pelphrey (1st season)
- Assistant coaches: Andre Bell; Alex Fain; Marcus King
- Home arena: Eblen Center

2019–20 Ohio Valley Conference men's basketball standings
	Conf.				Overall
Team	W		L	PCT	W		L	PCT
Belmont †	15	–	3	.833	26	–	7	.788
Murray State	15	–	3	.833	23	–	9	.719
Austin Peay	14	–	4	.778	21	–	12	.636
Eastern Kentucky	12	–	6	.667	16	–	17	.485
Tennessee State	9	–	9	.500	18	–	15	.545
Eastern Illinois	9	–	9	.500	17	–	15	.531
Jacksonville State	8	–	10	.444	13	–	19	.406
Morehead State	7	–	11	.389	13	–	19	.406
Tennessee Tech	6	–	12	.333	9	–	22	.290
UT Martin	5	–	13	.278	9	–	20	.310
SIU Edwardsville	5	–	13	.278	8	–	23	.258
Southeast Missouri State	3	–	15	.167	7	–	24	.226
† 2020 OVC tournament winner

The 2019–20 Tennessee Tech Golden Eagles men's basketball team represented Tennessee Technological University during the 2019–20 NCAA Division I men's basketball season. The Golden Eagles, led by first-year head coach John Pelphrey, played their home games at the Eblen Center in Cookeville, Tennessee as members of the Ohio Valley Conference (OVC). They finished the season 9–22, 6–12 in OVC play, to finish in ninth place. They failed to qualify for the OVC tournament.

== Previous season ==
The Golden Eagles finished the 2018–19 season 8–23 overall, 4–14 in OVC play, to finish in last place, and failed to qualify for the OVC tournament.

On March 3, 2019, the school announced that head coach Steve Payne had resigned after eight seasons at Tennessee Tech. On April 6, the school hired John Pelphrey, an assistant at Alabama, as the new head coach.

== Roster ==
2019–20 Tennessee Tech Golden Eagles men's basketball team
Players
Coaches

Pos.	#	Name	Height	Weight	Year	Hometown
F	0	Larry Kuimi	6 ft 6 in (1.98 m)	215 lb (98 kg)	Jr	Missouri City, TX
G	1	Maverick Smith	6 ft 5 in (1.96 m)	185 lb (84 kg)	Jr	Oakdale, TN
G	2	Jared Sherfield	6 ft 5 in (1.96 m)	165 lb (75 kg)	So	Tuscaloosa, AL
G	3	Keishawn Davidson	6 ft 2 in (1.88 m)	160 lb (73 kg)	Fr	Murfreesboro, TN
G	4	JR Clay	6 ft 0 in (1.83 m)	160 lb (73 kg)	So	Chattanooga, TN
G	5	Darius Allen	6 ft 5 in (1.96 m)	210 lb (95 kg)	Sr	Melbourne, FL
G	10	Chase Ridenour	6 ft 0 in (1.83 m)	195 lb (88 kg)	RS Fr	Knoxville, TN
G	11	Dane Quest	6 ft 6 in (1.98 m)	185 lb (84 kg)	Fr	Toronto, ON
F	12	Amadou Sylla	6 ft 8 in (2.03 m)	210 lb (95 kg)	So	Bamako, Mali
G	15	Tyler Thompson	6 ft 5 in (1.96 m)	205 lb (93 kg)	Sr	Kingston, TN
G	20	Hunter Vick	6 ft 4 in (1.93 m)	180 lb (82 kg)	So	Camden, TN
C	21	Reece Wilkinson	6 ft 9 in (2.06 m)	270 lb (122 kg)	RS Fr	Miami, FL
F	22	Tujautae Williams	6 ft 5 in (1.96 m)	185 lb (84 kg)	Fr	Chicago, IL
G	23	Caden Mills	6 ft 6 in (1.98 m)	190 lb (86 kg)	RS Fr	Spencer, TN
F	24	Garrett Golday	6 ft 7 in (2.01 m)	220 lb (100 kg)	So	Arlington, TN
G	51	Michael Lolio	6 ft 1 in (1.85 m)	185 lb (84 kg)	So	Spring, TX
G	54	Cade Crosland	6 ft 0 in (1.83 m)	180 lb (82 kg)	Sr	Sparta, TN

Head coach

- John Pelphrey (Kentucky)

Assistant coach(es)

- Andre Bell (Bemidji State)
- Alex Fain (Alabama)
- Marcus King (Northeastern State)

Legend

- (C) Team captain
- (S) Suspended
- (I) Ineligible
- (W) Walk-on
- Injured
- Current redshirt

Roster
Last update: September 18, 2019

== Schedule and results ==
Date time, TV	Opponent	Result	Record	Site (attendance) city, state
Exhibition
October 29, 2019*	Bryan College	W 84–65		Eblen Center; Cookeville, TN
Non-conference regular season
November 5, 2019*; 7:00 p.m., ESPN+	at Western Kentucky	L 64–76	0–1	E. A. Diddle Arena (4,841); Bowling Green, KY
November 9, 2019*; 7:00 p.m., ESPN+	Martin Methodist	W 83–70	1–1	Eblen Center (980); Cookeville, TN
November 12, 2019*; 7:30 p.m., ESPN+	Wright State	L 80–85 ^{OT}	1–2	Eblen Center; Cookeville, TN
November 15, 2019*; 6:00 p.m.	at UNC Greensboro; UNC Greensboro Tournament	L 30–64	1–3	Greensboro Coliseum Complex; Greensboro, NC
November 16, 2019*; 2:30 p.m.	vs. Appalachian State; UNC Greensboro Tournament	L 47–69	1–4	Greensboro Coliseum Complex; Greensboro, NC
November 17, 2019*; 11:00 a.m.	vs. Montana State; UNC Greensboro Tournament	L 39–52	1–5	Greensboro Coliseum Complex; Greensboro, NC
November 21, 2019*; 7:30 p.m.	at Winthrop	W 61–58	2–5	Winthrop Coliseum (2,033); Rock Hill, SC
November 25, 2019*; 6:00 p.m.	Lipscomb	L 65–78	2–6	Eblen Center (1,320); Cookeville, TN
December 2, 2019*; 6:00 p.m., ESPN+	Reinhardt	W 86–47	3–6	Eblen Center (765); Cookeville, TN
December 8, 2019*; 1:00 p.m., ESPN3	at Ohio	L 54–81	3–7	Convocation Center (3,402); Athens, OH
December 17, 2019*; 6:30 p.m.	at Lipscomb	L 60–78	3–8	Allen Arena (1,364); Nashville, TN
December 21, 2019*; 5:00 p.m., ESPN+	Western Carolina	L 76–89	3–9	Eblen Center (1,392); Cookeville, TN
December 29, 2019*; 3:00 p.m., SECN+	at Ole Miss	L 63–80	3–10	The Pavilion at Ole Miss (7,261); Oxford, MS
OVC regular season
January 2, 2020; 6:30 p.m., ESPN+	at Eastern Kentucky	L 59–74	3–11 (0–1)	Alumni Coliseum (1,814); Richmond, KY
January 4, 2020; 2:00 p.m., ESPN+	at Morehead State	L 72–83	3–12 (0–2)	Ellis Johnson Arena (1,518); Morehead, KY
January 9, 2020; 6:00 p.m., ESPN+	Austin Peay	L 62–75	3–13 (0–3)	Eblen Center (2,032); Cookeville, TN
January 11, 2020; 7:30 p.m., ESPN+	Murray State	L 69–81	3–14 (0–4)	Eblen Center (1,106); Cookeville, TN
January 16, 2020; 7:30 p.m., ESPN+	at SIU Edwardsville	W 72–69	4–14 (1–4)	Vadalabene Center (527); Edwardsville, IL
January 18, 2020; 3:15 p.m., ESPN+	at Eastern Illinois	L 59–84	4–15 (1–5)	Lantz Arena (1,525); Charleston, IL
January 23, 2020; 7:30 p.m., ESPN+	Morehead State	W 71–59	5–15 (2–5)	Eblen Center (1,679); Cookeville, TN
January 25, 2020; 7:30 p.m., ESPN+	Eastern Kentucky	L 74–80	5–16 (2–6)	Eblen Center (2,051); Cookeville, TN
January 30, 2020; 8:00 p.m., ESPNU	Belmont	L 84–92	5–17 (2–7)	Eblen Center (1,697); Cookeville, TN
February 1, 2020; 7:30 p.m., ESPN+	Tennessee State	L 67–72	5–18 (2–8)	Eblen Center (1,702); Cookeville, TN
February 6, 2020; 7:30 p.m., ESPN+	at UT Martin	L 62–74	5–19 (2–9)	Skyhawk Arena (1,175); Martin, TN
February 8, 2020; 4:00 p.m., ESPN+	at Southeast Missouri State	W 62–60	6–19 (3–9)	Show Me Center (1,486); Cape Girardeau, MO
February 13, 2020; 6:00 p.m., ESPN+	Jacksonville State	W 75–74	7–19 (4–9)	Eblen Center (888); Cookeville, TN
February 15, 2020; 7:30 p.m., ESPN+	at Tennessee State	L 55–70	7–20 (4–10)	Gentry Complex (2,221); Nashville, TN
February 20, 2020; 7:30 p.m., ESPN+	UT Martin	W 78–65	8–20 (5–10)	Eblen Center (1,685); Cookeville, TN
February 22, 2020; 4:00 p.m., ESPN+	Southeast Missouri State	W 71–62	9–20 (6–10)	Eblen Center (1,847); Cookeville, TN
February 27, 2020; 7:00 p.m., ESPN+	at Belmont	L 62–65	9–21 (6–11)	Curb Event Center (2,304); Nashville, TN
February 29, 2020; 7:00 p.m., ESPN+	at Jacksonville State	L 71–75	9–22 (6–12)	Pete Mathews Coliseum (885); Jacksonville, AL
*Non-conference game. (#) Tournament seedings in parentheses. All times are in Central.
