= 2019–20 Belmont Bruins men's basketball team =

American college basketball season

2019–20 Belmont Bruins men's basketball

OVC regular season co-champions OVC tournament champions
- Conference: Ohio Valley Conference
- Record: 26–7 (15–3 OVC)
- Head coach: Casey Alexander (1st season)
- Associate head coach: Brian Ayers
- Assistant coaches: Sean Rutigliano; Tyler Holloway
- Home arena: Curb Event Center

2019–20 Ohio Valley Conference men's basketball standings
	Conf.				Overall
Team	W		L	PCT	W		L	PCT
Belmont †	15	–	3	.833	26	–	7	.788
Murray State	15	–	3	.833	23	–	9	.719
Austin Peay	14	–	4	.778	21	–	12	.636
Eastern Kentucky	12	–	6	.667	16	–	17	.485
Tennessee State	9	–	9	.500	18	–	15	.545
Eastern Illinois	9	–	9	.500	17	–	15	.531
Jacksonville State	8	–	10	.444	13	–	19	.406
Morehead State	7	–	11	.389	13	–	19	.406
Tennessee Tech	6	–	12	.333	9	–	22	.290
UT Martin	5	–	13	.278	9	–	20	.310
SIU Edwardsville	5	–	13	.278	8	–	23	.258
Southeast Missouri State	3	–	15	.167	7	–	24	.226
† 2020 OVC tournament winner

The 2019–20 Belmont Bruins men's basketball team represented Belmont University in the 2019–20 NCAA Division I men's basketball season. The Bruins, led by first-year head coach Casey Alexander, played their home games at the Curb Event Center in Nashville, Tennessee as members of the Ohio Valley Conference. They finished the season 26–7, 15–3 in OVC play to finish in a tie for the OVC regular season championship. They defeated Eastern Kentucky and Murray State to be champions of the OVC tournament. They earned the OVC's automatic bid to the NCAA tournament. However, the NCAA Tournament was cancelled amid the COVID-19 pandemic.

== Previous season ==
The Bruins finished the 2018–19 season 27–6 overall, 16–2 in OVC play to finish as Ohio Valley regular season co-champions, alongside Murray State. In the OVC tournament, they defeated Austin Peay in the semifinals, advancing to the championship, where they were defeated by Murray State. Due to their successful season, they received an at-large bid into the NCAA tournament, earning the No. 11 seed in the East Region. They were matched up against fellow No. 11 seed Temple in the First Four, winning the game 81–70, earning their first NCAA Tournament win in program history. They faced No. 6 seeded Maryland in the first round, nearly pulling off the upset, losing 77–79.

On April 1, 2019, longtime head coach Rick Byrd announced that he was retiring, after leading the team for 33 years. On April 10, Lipscomb head coach and Belmont alum Casey Alexander was named as Byrd's successor.

== Roster ==
2019–20 Belmont Bruins men's basketball team
Players
Coaches

Pos.	#	Name	Height	Weight	Year	Hometown
F	0	Tyler Scanlon	6 ft 7 in (2.01 m)	215 lb (98 kg)	GS	Centreville, Virginia
G	1	Mitch Listau	6 ft 4 in (1.93 m)	195 lb (88 kg)	Fr	Waunakee, Wisconsin
G	2	Grayson Murphy	6 ft 2 in (1.88 m)	175 lb (79 kg)	RS So	Franklin, Tennessee
G	3	Luke Smith	6 ft 0 in (1.83 m)	175 lb (79 kg)	Jr	Knoxville, Tennessee
G	4	Garrett Suedekum	6 ft 2 in (1.88 m)	170 lb (77 kg)	Jr	Brentwood, Tennessee
G	5	Adam Kunkel	6 ft 3 in (1.91 m)	165 lb (75 kg)	So	Hebron, Kentucky
F	10	Caleb Hollander	6 ft 8 in (2.03 m)	225 lb (102 kg)	So	Nashville, Tennessee
F	11	Michael Shanks	6 ft 6 in (1.98 m)	200 lb (91 kg)	Fr	Bentonville, Arkansas
G	12	EJ Bellinger	6 ft 4 in (1.93 m)	195 lb (88 kg)	Fr	St. Peters, Missouri
G	14	Nick Hopkins	6 ft 0 in (1.83 m)	175 lb (79 kg)	Jr	Fayetteville, Tennessee
G	20	Tate Pierson	6 ft 6 in (1.98 m)	200 lb (91 kg)	So	Brentwood, Tennessee
F	21	Derek Sabin	6 ft 9 in (2.06 m)	230 lb (104 kg)	So	Slinger, Wisconsin
G	22	Ben Sheppard	6 ft 6 in (1.98 m)	180 lb (82 kg)	Fr	Atlanta, Georgia
G	24	Michael Benkert	6 ft 4 in (1.93 m)	200 lb (91 kg)	Sr	Greenwood, Indiana
C	33	Nick Muszynski	6 ft 11 in (2.11 m)	235 lb (107 kg)	RS So	Pickerington, Ohio
F	42	Rilee Epley	6 ft 4 in (1.93 m)	195 lb (88 kg)	Fr	Newburgh, Indiana
C	50	Seth Adelsperger	6 ft 11 in (2.11 m)	230 lb (104 kg)	Sr	Peru, Indiana

Head coach

- Casey Alexander (Belmont)

Assistant coach(es)

- Brian Ayers (Lipscomb)
- Sean Rutigliano (Cortland State)
- Tyler Holloway (Murray State)

Legend

- (C) Team captain
- (S) Suspended
- (I) Ineligible
- (W) Walk-on
- Injured
- Current redshirt

Roster
Last update: December 2, 2019

== Schedule and results ==
Date time, TV	Rank^{#}	Opponent^{#}	Result	Record	Site (attendance) city, state
Non-conference regular season
November 6, 2019*; 7:00 pm, ESPN+		at Illinois State	L 72–79	0–1	Redbird Arena (5,310); Normal, IL
November 11, 2019*; 6:30 pm, ESPN+		Samford	W 95–63	1–1	Curb Event Center (2,638); Nashville, TN
November 16, 2019*; 2:00 pm, ACC Network		at Boston College	W 100–85	2–1	Conte Forum (5,540); Chestnut Hill, MA
November 18, 2019*; 6:30 pm, ESPN+		High Point	W 90–51	3–1	Curb Event Center (1,556); Nashville, TN
November 20, 2019*; 6:30 pm, ESPN+		at Lipscomb; Battle of the Boulevard	W 73–67	4–1	Allen Arena (3,628); Nashville, TN
November 23, 2019*; 4:00 pm, Fox Sports Midwest		at Saint Louis	L 55–60	4–2	Chaifetz Arena (6,236); St. Louis, MO
November 26, 2019*; 6:00 pm, Pluto TV		at Eastern Washington	L 82–87	4–3	Reese Court (1,305); Cheney, WA
November 30, 2019*; 7:30 pm, Stadium		at Middle Tennessee	W 71–59	5–3	Murphy Center (3,806); Murfreesboro, TN
December 3, 2019*; 6:30 pm, ESPN+		Lipscomb; Battle of the Boulevard	W 80–75	6–3	Curb Event Center (3,318); Nashville, TN
December 11, 2019*; 6:30 pm, ESPN+		Carson–Newman	W 105–56	7–3	Curb Event Center (1,343); Nashville, TN
December 18, 2019*; 6:30 pm, ESPN+		Kennesaw State	W 83–44	8–3	Curb Event Center (1,283); Nashville, TN
December 21, 2019*; 2:30 pm, SECN		vs. Alabama; Rocket City Classic	L 72–92	8–4	Von Braun Center (5,712); Huntsville, AL
December 28, 2019*; 6:30 pm, Stadium		at Western Kentucky	W 79–62	9–4	E. A. Diddle Arena (5,102); Bowling Green, KY
OVC regular season
January 2, 2020; 7:00 pm, ESPN+		SIU Edwardsville	L 69–79	9–5 (0–1)	Curb Event Center (1,960); Nashville, TN
January 4, 2020; 4:00 pm, ESPN+		Eastern Illinois	W 87–55	10–5 (1–1)	Curb Event Center (1,905); Nashville, TN
January 9, 2020; 7:15 pm, ESPN+		at Southeast Missouri State	W 89–64	11–5 (2–1)	Show Me Center (1,097); Cape Girardeau, MO
January 11, 2020; 4:00 pm, ESPN+		at UT Martin	W 85–78	12–5 (3–1)	Skyhawk Arena (1,652); Martin, TN
January 16, 2020; 8:00 pm, ESPNU		Eastern Kentucky	W 87–56	13–5 (4–1)	Curb Event Center (1,736); Nashville, TN
January 18, 2020; 4:00 pm, ESPN+		Morehead State	W 77–59	14–5 (5–1)	Curb Event Center (2,204); Nashville, TN
January 23, 2020; 6:00 pm, ESPN2		at Murray State	L 75–85	14–6 (5–2)	CFSB Center (6,023); Murray, KY
January 25, 2020; 4:00 pm, ESPN+		at Austin Peay	L 78–86	14–7 (5–3)	Dunn Center (2,429); Clarksville, TN
January 30, 2020; 8:00 pm, ESPNU		at Tennessee Tech	W 92–84	15–7 (6–3)	Eblen Center (1,697); Cookeville, TN
February 1, 2020; 4:00 pm, ESPN+		at Jacksonville State	W 78–64	16–7 (7–3)	Pete Mathews Coliseum (1,298); Jacksonville, AL
February 6, 2020; 6:30 pm, ESPN+		Murray State	W 71–64	17–7 (8–3)	Curb Event Center (2,703); Nashville, TN
February 8, 2020; 5:00 pm, ESPN+		Austin Peay	W 71–63	18–7 (9–3)	Curb Event Center (2,898); Nashville, TN
February 13, 2020; 7:00 pm, ESPN+		Tennessee State	W 74–51	19–7 (10–3)	Curb Event Center (3,240); Nashville, TN
February 15, 2020; 5:00 pm, ESPN+		Jacksonville State	W 101–84	20–7 (11–3)	Curb Event Center (3,388); Nashville, TN
February 20, 2020; 6:00 pm, ESPN+		at Morehead State	W 80–67	21–7 (12–3)	Ellis Johnson Arena (2,118); Morehead, KY
February 22, 2020; 6:00 pm, ESPN+		at Eastern Kentucky	W 83–70	22–7 (13–3)	McBrayer Arena (2,658); Richmond, KY
February 27, 2020; 7:00 pm, ESPN+		Tennessee Tech	W 65–62	23–7 (14–3)	Curb Event Center (2,304); Nashville, TN
February 29, 2020; 7:30 pm, ESPN+		at Tennessee State	W 72–65	24–7 (15–3)	Gentry Complex; Nashville, TN
Ohio Valley Conference tournament
March 6, 2020; 7:00 pm, ESPNU	(1)	vs. (4) Eastern Kentucky; Semifinals	W 60–50	25–7	Ford Center (3,435); Evansville, IN
March 7, 2020; 7:00 pm, ESPN2	(1)	vs. (2) Murray State; Championship	W 76–75	26–7	Ford Center (4,456); Evansville, IN
*Non-conference game. ^{#}Rankings from AP Poll. (#) Tournament seedings in parentheses. All times are in Central.
