= 2019–20 Murray State Racers men's basketball team =

American college basketball season

2019–20 Murray State Racers men's basketball
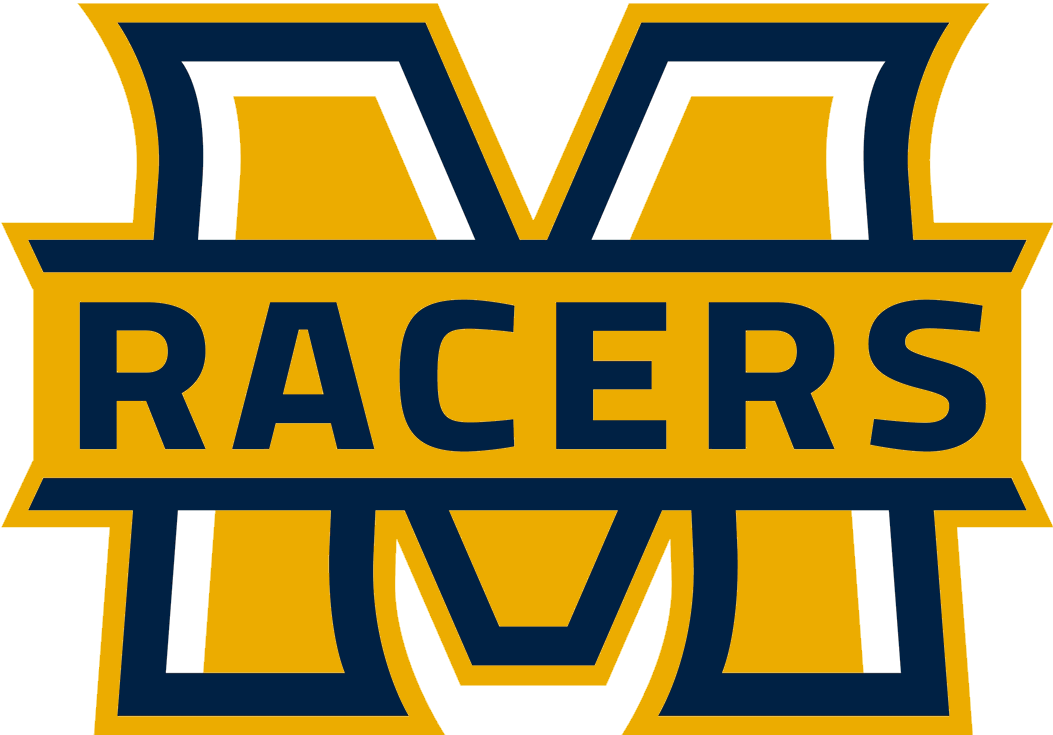

Ohio Valley regular season co-champions
- Conference: Ohio Valley Conference
- Record: 23–9 (15–3 OVC)
- Head coach: Matt McMahon (5th season)
- Assistant coaches: Shane Nichols; Tim Kaine; Casey Long
- Home arena: CFSB Center

2019–20 Ohio Valley Conference men's basketball standings
	Conf.				Overall
Team	W		L	PCT	W		L	PCT
Belmont †	15	–	3	.833	26	–	7	.788
Murray State	15	–	3	.833	23	–	9	.719
Austin Peay	14	–	4	.778	21	–	12	.636
Eastern Kentucky	12	–	6	.667	16	–	17	.485
Tennessee State	9	–	9	.500	18	–	15	.545
Eastern Illinois	9	–	9	.500	17	–	15	.531
Jacksonville State	8	–	10	.444	13	–	19	.406
Morehead State	7	–	11	.389	13	–	19	.406
Tennessee Tech	6	–	12	.333	9	–	22	.290
UT Martin	5	–	13	.278	9	–	20	.310
SIU Edwardsville	5	–	13	.278	8	–	23	.258
Southeast Missouri State	3	–	15	.167	7	–	24	.226
† 2020 OVC tournament winner

The 2019–20 Murray State Racers men's basketball team represented Murray State University during the 2019–20 NCAA Division I men's basketball season. The Racers, led by fifth-year head coach Matt McMahon, played their home games at the CFSB Center in Murray, Kentucky as members of the Ohio Valley Conference (OVC). They finished the season 23–9, 15–3 in OVC play, to finish in a tie for the OVC regular season championship. They defeated Austin Peay in the semifinals of the OVC tournament to advance to the championship game where they lost to Belmont. With 23 wins, they were a candidate for a postseason bid. However, all postseason tournaments were cancelled amid the COVID-19 pandemic.

== Previous season ==
The Racers finished the 2018–19 season 28–5, 16–2 in OVC play, to tie as OVC regular season championship with Belmont. They defeated Jacksonville State and Belmont to become champions of the OVC tournament. They earned the OVC's automatic bid to the NCAA tournament where they won in the first round against Marquette. They then lost in the second round to Florida State.

== Roster ==
2019–20 Murray State Racers men's basketball team
Players
Coaches

Pos.	#	Name	Height	Weight	Year	Previous school	Hometown
F	0	Demond Robinson	6 ft 8 in (2.03 m)	255 lb (116 kg)	Fr	Lee HS	Montgomery, AL
G	1	DaQuan Smith	6 ft 1 in (1.85 m)	185 lb (84 kg)	RS Fr	Holly Springs HS	Holly Springs, MS
G	2	Chico Jr. Carter	6 ft 2 in (1.88 m)	190 lb (86 kg)	Fr	Cardinal Newman HS	Columbia, SC
G	4	Noah Kamba	6 ft 2 in (1.88 m)	180 lb (82 kg)	Fr	Dexter Southfield School	Lynn, MA
G	10	Tevin Brown	6 ft 5 in (1.96 m)	175 lb (79 kg)	RS So	Fairhope HS	Fairhope, AL
F	11	Matt Smith (redshirt)	6 ft 6 in (1.98 m)	225 lb (102 kg)	Fr	Independence HS	Charlotte, NC
F	13	Devin Gilmore	6 ft 6 in (1.98 m)	200 lb (91 kg)	Jr	Madison-Ridgeland	Picayune, MS
G	14	Jaiveon Eaves	6 ft 2 in (1.88 m)	205 lb (93 kg)	Sr	Madisonville North Hopkins HS; John A. Logan College	Madisonville, KY
G	22	Brion Whitley (injured) (redshirt)	6 ft 4 in (1.93 m)	200 lb (91 kg)	Jr	Riverview HS	Sarasota, FL
F	23	KJ Williams	6 ft 10 in (2.08 m)	245 lb (111 kg)	So	Cleveland Central HS	Cleveland, MS
F	24	Anthony Smith	6 ft 7 in (2.01 m)	225 lb (102 kg)	RS Sr	Potomac HS; Barton CC	Suitland, MD
G	25	Rod Thomas	6 ft 0 in (1.83 m)	183 lb (83 kg)	Fr	Paducah Tilghman HS	Paducah, KY
F	32	Darnell Cowart	6 ft 8 in (2.03 m)	280 lb (127 kg)	Sr	Agua Fria HS; Cowley College	Chicago, IL
G	45	Jason Holliday	6 ft 4 in (1.93 m)	200 lb (91 kg)	Jr	Brusly HS; Bossier Parish CC	Baton Rouge, LA

Head coach

- Matt McMahon (Appalachian State)

Assistant coach(es)

- Shane Nichols (Wofford)
- Tim Kaine (Winthrop)
- Casey Long (Chattanooga)

Legend

- (C) Team captain
- (S) Suspended
- (I) Ineligible
- (W) Walk-on
- Injured
- Current redshirt

Roster
Last update: October 23, 2019

== Schedule and results ==
Date time, TV	Rank^{#}	Opponent^{#}	Result	Record	Site (attendance) city, state
Exhibition
November 4, 2019*; 7:00 p.m., ESPN+		Martin Methodist	W 105–64		CFSB Center; Murray, KY
Regular season
November 9, 2019*; 7:00 p.m., ESPN+		Southern	W 69–49	1–0	CFSB Center (3,709); Murray, KY
November 12, 2019*; 8:00 p.m., SECN+		at Tennessee	L 63–82	1–1	Thompson–Boling Arena (16,913); Knoxville, TN
November 16, 2019*; 7:30 p.m., ESPN+		Brescia	W 114–48	2–1	CFSB Center (3,909); Murray, KY
November 19, 2019*; 7:00 p.m., ESPN+		Southern Illinois	W 79–66	3–1	CFSB Center (4,549); Murray, KY
November 25, 2019*; 6:30 p.m.		vs. La Salle; Gulf Coast Showcase first round	L 64–75	3–2	Hertz Arena (1,112); Estero, FL
November 26, 2019*; 12:30 p.m.		vs. Weber State; Gulf Coast Showcase consolation 2nd round	W 69–68	4–2	Hertz Arena (786); Estero, FL
November 27, 2019*; 12:30 p.m.		vs. Drake; Gulf Coast Showcase 5th-place game	L 53–63	4–3	Hertz Arena (653); Estero, FL
December 3, 2019*; 7:00 p.m., ESPN3		at Missouri State	L 69–71	4–4	JQH Arena (3,817); Springfield, MO
December 7, 2019*; 7:00 p.m., ESPN+		Middle Tennessee	W 85–52	5–4	CFSB Center (4,807); Murray, KY
December 16, 2019*; 7:00 p.m., ESPN+		Kennesaw State	W 74–38	6–4	CFSB Center (3,016); Murray, KY
December 21, 2019*; 6:00 p.m., ESPN+		at Evansville	L 76–78	6–5	Ford Center (7,316); Evansville, IN
December 28, 2019*; 7:00 p.m., ESPN+		Cumberland (TN)	W 81–46	7–5	CFSB Center (4,107); Murray, KY
OVC regular season
January 2, 2020; 7:00 p.m., ESPN+		UT Martin	W 89–76	8–5 (1–0)	CFSB Center (3,314); Murray, KY
January 4, 2020; 7:00 p.m., ESPN+		Southeast Missouri State	W 81–59	9–5 (2–0)	CFSB Center (4,125); Murray, KY
January 9, 2020*; 8:00 p.m., ESPNU		at Jacksonville State	W 72–68	10–5 (3–0)	Pete Mathews Coliseum (3,139); Jacksonville, AL
January 11, 2020; 7:30 p.m., ESPN+		at Tennessee Tech	W 81–69	11–5 (4–0)	Eblen Center (1,106); Cookeville, TN
January 16, 2020; 7:30 p.m., ESPN+		at UT Martin	W 84–62	12–5 (5–0)	Skyhawk Arena (3,209); Martin, TN
January 18, 2020; 4:00 p.m., ESPN+		at Southeast Missouri State	W 96–91	13–5 (6–0)	Show Me Center (1,784); Cape Girardeau, MO
January 23, 2020; 6:00 p.m., ESPN2		Belmont	W 85–75	14–5 (7–0)	CFSB Center (6,023); Murray, KY
January 25, 2020; 7:00 p.m., ESPN+		Tennessee State	W 76–64	15–5 (8–0)	CFSB Center (4,925); Murray, KY
January 30, 2020; 7:00 p.m., ESPN+		Eastern Illinois	W 73–70	16–5 (9–0)	CFSB Center (4,530); Murray, KY
February 1, 2020; 7:00 p.m., ESPN+		SIU Edwardsville	W 74–55	17–5 (10–0)	CFSB Center (7,512); Murray, KY
February 6, 2020; 6:30 p.m., ESPN+		at Belmont	L 64–71	17–6 (10–1)	Curb Event Center (2,703); Nashville, TN
February 8, 2020; 7:30 p.m., ESPN+		at Tennessee State	W 73–65	18–6 (11–1)	Gentry Complex (3,102); Nashville, TN
February 13, 2020; 8:00 p.m., ESPNU		at Austin Peay	L 68–71	18–7 (11–2)	Dunn Center (4,052); Clarksville, TN
February 15, 2020; 4:00 p.m., ESPN+		Morehead State	W 85–57	19–7 (12–2)	CFSB Center (4,816); Murray, KY
February 20, 2020; 7:30 p.m., ESPN+		at Eastern Illinois	L 60–63	19–8 (12–3)	Lantz Arena (1,444); Charleston, IL
February 22, 2020; 2:00 p.m., ESPN+		at SIU Edwardsville	W 59–58	20–8 (13–3)	Sam M. Vadalabene Center (747); Edwardsville, IL
February 27, 2020; 7:00 p.m., ESPN+		Eastern Kentucky	W 74–62	21–8 (14–3)	CFSB Center (5,727); Murray, KY
February 29, 2020; 7:00 p.m., ESPN+		Austin Peay	W 75–61	22–8 (15–3)	CFSB Center (8,229); Murray, KY
Ohio Valley Conference tournament
March 6, 2020; 9:00 p.m., ESPNU	(2)	vs. (3) Austin Peay; Semifinals	W 73–61	23–8	Ford Center (3,435); Evansville, IN
March 7, 2020; 7:00 p.m., ESPN2	(2)	vs. (1) Belmont; Championship	L 75–76	23–9	Ford Center (4,456); Evansville, IN
*Non-conference game. ^{#}Rankings from AP Poll. (#) Tournament seedings in parentheses. All times are in Central.
