= Terry Taylor (basketball) =

American basketball player (born 1999)

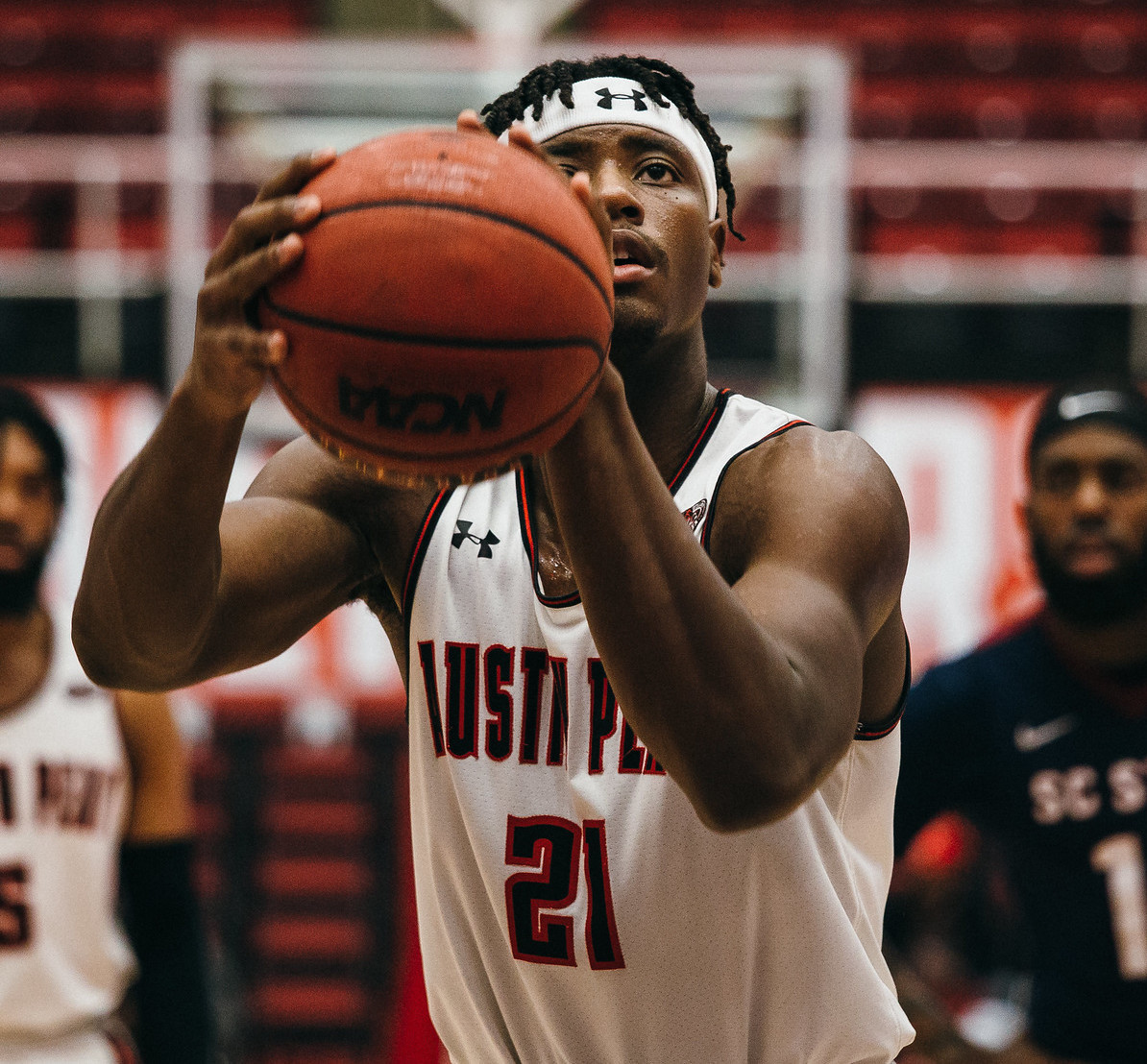
- Taylor with Austin Peay in 2019

No. 32 – Austin Spurs
- Position: Small forward / power forward
- League: NBA G League

Personal information
- Born: September 23, 1999 (age 27) Bowling Green, Kentucky, U.S.
- Listed height: 6 ft 5 in (1.96 m)
- Listed weight: 230 lb (104 kg)

Career information
- High school: Bowling Green (Bowling Green, Kentucky)
- College: Austin Peay (2017–2021)
- NBA draft: 2021: undrafted
- Playing career: 2021–present

Career history
- 2021: Fort Wayne Mad Ants
- 2021–2023: Indiana Pacers
- 2021–2023: →Fort Wayne Mad Ants
- 2023–2024: Chicago Bulls
- 2023: →Windy City Bulls
- 2024–2025: Stockton Kings
- 2025: Sacramento Kings
- 2025–2026: Brisbane Bullets
- 2026: Iowa Wolves
- 2026–present: Austin Spurs

Career highlights
- NBA G League champion (2025); 2× OVC Player of the Year (2020, 2021); 4× First-team All-OVC (2018–2021); OVC Freshman of the Year (2018)
- Stats at NBA.com
- Stats at Basketball Reference

Terry Taylor (born September 23, 1999) is an American professional basketball player for the Austin Spurs of the NBA G League. He has previously played in the National Basketball Association (NBA) for the Indiana Pacers, Chicago Bulls, and Sacramento Kings. He played college basketball for the Austin Peay Governors.

== Early life ==
Taylor grew up in Bowling Green, Kentucky and attended Bowling Green High School. During his junior year, he averaged 15.3 points and 11.3 rebounds per game and was named second-team All-State. Taylor committed to play college basketball at Austin Peay State University going into his senior year over offers from Texas Southern and Southeast Missouri State. As a senior, Taylor averaged 17.7 points and 11.8 rebounds per game and was named first team All-State and the MVP of the Kentucky Sweet 16 after averaging 20.5 points and 10 rebounds where he led Bowling Green to its first state title, alongside Zion Harmon, former consensus four-star recruit in the class of 2021. Taylor scored 1,704 points and grabbed 1,300 rebounds over four seasons with Bowling Green.

== College career ==
As a true freshman, Taylor averaged 15.6 points and 8.6 rebounds per game and was named the Ohio Valley Conference (OVC) Freshman of the Year and first team All-OVC. As a sophomore he averaged 20.5 points and 10.5 rebounds per game and was again named first team All-OVC. He scored the 1,000th point of his college career during the season as part of a 25-point, 12-rebound performance in a win over Eastern Illinois on February 9, 2019. Taylor's career-high 39 points came on December 17, in an 80–61 win over McKendree. On January 23, 2020, Taylor hit a career-high six three-pointers and had 37 points and 14 rebounds in a 99–74 win over Tennessee State. Taylor was named the Ohio Valley Conference Men's Basketball Player of the Year and first team All-OVC for a third straight season as a junior after averaging 21.8 points, 11.0 rebounds and 1.3 blocks per game. Following the season, Taylor declared for the 2020 NBA draft, but maintained his college eligibility, ultimately returning for his senior year.

On December 5, 2020, Taylor surpassed the 2,000-career-point mark, scoring 10 points in a 102–38 win against Carver College.

== Professional career ==
=== Fort Wayne Mad Ants / Indiana Pacers (2021–2023) ===
After not being selected in the 2021 NBA draft, Taylor signed with the Indiana Pacers on August 5, 2021. He played for the Pacers during the 2021 NBA Summer League, but was waived on October 15. Nine days later, he joined the Fort Wayne Mad Ants of the NBA G League. After 11 games for Fort Wayne, he signed a two-way contract with Indiana on December 15, 2021. Under the terms of the deal, he split time between the Pacers and the Mad Ants.

On February 2, 2022, in his seventh NBA game against the Orlando Magic, Taylor subbed in 22 seconds into the game and stepped up as the Pacers' center. He recorded career highs of 24 points, 16 rebounds and 3 assists in 37 minutes for his first career double-double. On April 7, 2022, the Pacers converted his two-way contract into a standard one.

In 18 games for Fort Wayne during the 2021–22 NBA G League season, Taylor averaged 21.3 points, 11.9 rebounds, 2.4 assists and 1.5 steals per game.

Taylor played for the Pacers during the 2022 NBA Summer League. After fives games with Fort Wayne and 26 games with Indiana during the 2022–23 season, he was waived by the Pacers on February 9, 2023.

=== Chicago / Windy City Bulls (2023–2024) ===
On February 22, 2023, Taylor signed a two-way contract with the Chicago Bulls. He played seven games with the Windy City Bulls to finish the 2022–23 NBA G League season, while also playing five games for Chicago to finish the 2022–23 NBA season.

On August 14, 2023, Taylor signed a standard contract with Chicago. He was waived on April 4, 2024.

Taylor played for the Los Angeles Clippers during the 2024 NBA Summer League.

=== Sacramento / Stockton Kings (2024–2025) ===
On September 23, 2024, Taylor signed with the Sacramento Kings, but was waived on October 18. On October 27, he joined the Stockton Kings for the 2024–25 NBA G League season. On March 18, 2025, he signed a 10-day contract with Sacramento. He appeared in three NBA games, and following the expiration of his 10-day contract, he returned to Stockton.

=== Brisbane Bullets (2025–2026) ===
On July 14, 2025, Taylor signed a one-year contract with the Ningbo Rockets of the Chinese Basketball Association. On November 15, his contract was terminated.

On December 1, 2025, Taylor signed with the Brisbane Bullets of the Australian National Basketball League (NBL) for the rest of the 2025–26 season.

== Career statistics ==
Legend
GP	Games played	GS	Games started	MPG	Minutes per game
FG%	Field goal percentage	3P%	3-point field goal percentage	FT%	Free throw percentage
RPG	Rebounds per game	APG	Assists per game	SPG	Steals per game
BPG	Blocks per game	PPG	Points per game	**Bold**	Career high

=== NBA ===
==== Regular season ====
Year	Team	GP	GS	MPG	FG%	3P%	FT%	RPG	APG	SPG	BPG	PPG
2021–22	Indiana	**33**	**7**	**21.6**	.614	.316	.706	**5.2**	**1.2**	**.4**	**.2**	**9.6**
2022–23	Indiana	26	2	8.8	.462	.222	.714	1.5	.4	.1	**.2**	2.7
2022–23	Chicago	5	0	7.1	**.900**	**1.000**	.250	1.6	.0	.0	**.2**	4.0
2023–24	Chicago	31	0	6.1	.513	.222	**.800**	1.2	.3	.2	.1	1.5
2024–25	Sacramento	3	0	2.1	.000	—	—	.3	.7	.0	.0	.0
Career		98	9	11.9	.579	.288	.687	2.6	.6	.2	.2	4.6

=== College ===
Year	Team	GP	GS	MPG	FG%	3P%	FT%	RPG	APG	SPG	BPG	PPG
2017–18	Austin Peay	**34**	**34**	31.5	.541	**.432**	.730	8.6	.7	.6	1.0	15.6
2018–19	Austin Peay	33	33	33.1	.531	.340	.741	8.9	**1.7**	1.1	.9	20.5
2019–20	Austin Peay	33	33	36.6	**.550**	.320	.652	11.0	1.4	**1.3**	**1.3**	**21.8**
2020–21	Austin Peay	27	27	**37.0**	.521	.279	**.794**	**11.1**	1.6	1.2	.9	21.6
Career		127	127	34.4	.536	.341	.725	9.8	1.4	1.0	1.0	19.7

== Personal life ==
In 2025, Taylor and his partner Brena had their first child.

== See also ==
- List of NCAA Division I men's basketball players with 2,000 points and 1,000 rebounds
