= 2019–20 UT Martin Skyhawks men's basketball team =

American college basketball season

2019–20 UT Martin Skyhawks men's basketball
- Conference: Ohio Valley Conference
- West Division
- Record: 9–20 (5–13 OVC)
- Head coach: Anthony Stewart (4th season)
- Assistant coaches: Bill Lewit (1st season); DeAndre Walker (6th season); Zach Carpenter (3rd season)
- Home arena: Skyhawk Arena

2019–20 Ohio Valley Conference men's basketball standings
	Conf.				Overall
Team	W		L	PCT	W		L	PCT
Belmont †	15	–	3	.833	26	–	7	.788
Murray State	15	–	3	.833	23	–	9	.719
Austin Peay	14	–	4	.778	21	–	12	.636
Eastern Kentucky	12	–	6	.667	16	–	17	.485
Tennessee State	9	–	9	.500	18	–	15	.545
Eastern Illinois	9	–	9	.500	17	–	15	.531
Jacksonville State	8	–	10	.444	13	–	19	.406
Morehead State	7	–	11	.389	13	–	19	.406
Tennessee Tech	6	–	12	.333	9	–	22	.290
UT Martin	5	–	13	.278	9	–	20	.310
SIU Edwardsville	5	–	13	.278	8	–	23	.258
Southeast Missouri State	3	–	15	.167	7	–	24	.226
† 2020 OVC tournament winner

The 2019–20 UT Martin Skyhawks men's basketball team represented the University of Tennessee at Martin during the 2019–20 NCAA Division I men's basketball season. The Skyhawks, led by fourth-year head coach Anthony Stewart, played their home games at Skyhawk Arena as members of the Ohio Valley Conference. They finished the season 9–20, 5–13 in OVC play to finish in a tie for 10th place. They failed to qualify for the OVC tournament.

On November 15, 2020, head coach Anthony Stewart suddenly died at age 50.

== Previous season ==
The Skyhawks finished the 2018–19 season 12–19, 6–12 in OVC play to finish in seventh place. In the OVC tournament, they defeated Eastern Illinois in the first round, before falling to Jacksonville State in the quarterfinals.

== Roster ==
2019–20 UT Martin Skyhawks men's basketball team
Players
Coaches

Pos.	#	Name	Height	Weight	Year	Hometown
G	0	Ja'Darius Harris	6 ft 2 in (1.88 m)	170 lb (77 kg)	Fr	Trenton, Tennessee
G	1	Parker Stewart	6 ft 5 in (1.96 m)	200 lb (91 kg)	RS So	Union City, Tennessee
G	2	Craig Randall II	6 ft 5 in (1.96 m)	185 lb (84 kg)	RS Sr	Youngstown, Ohio
G	3	Eman Sertovic	6 ft 5 in (1.96 m)	195 lb (88 kg)	Fr	Bihać, Bosnia and Herzegovina
G	5	Derek Hawthorne, Jr.	6 ft 3 in (1.91 m)	205 lb (93 kg)	Sr	Indianapolis, Indiana
C	10	Eric Rustin	7 ft 0 in (2.13 m)	185 lb (84 kg)	Fr	Richmond, Virginia
G	11	Jalen Riley	6 ft 2 in (1.88 m)	190 lb (86 kg)	So	Los Angeles, California
F	12	Ajani Kennedy	6 ft 9 in (2.06 m)	215 lb (98 kg)	Jr	Moreno Valley, California
F	13	Miles Thomas	6 ft 6 in (1.98 m)	180 lb (82 kg)	RS Jr	Chattanooga, Tennessee
F	22	Quintin Dove	6 ft 8 in (2.03 m)	210 lb (95 kg)	Sr	Cleveland, Ohio
F	23	Steve Wooten, Jr.	6 ft 6 in (1.98 m)	215 lb (98 kg)	Jr	Madison, Wisconsin
F	24	Isaac Aguiar	6 ft 10 in (2.08 m)	220 lb (100 kg)	Fr	North Arlington, New Jersey
C	31	Jordan Pierce	7 ft 0 in (2.13 m)	290 lb (132 kg)	Jr	Union, New Jersey
G	34	Trenten Williams	6 ft 3 in (1.91 m)	175 lb (79 kg)	RS Jr	Houston, Texas
C	44	Hannes Pöllä	6 ft 11 in (2.11 m)	270 lb (122 kg)	Jr	Lahti, Finland

Head coach

- Anthony Stewart (Mount Union)

Assistant coach(es)

- Bill Lewit (Salisbury)
- DeAndre Walker (Fairmont State)
- Zack Carpenter (Lee)

Legend

- (C) Team captain
- (S) Suspended
- (I) Ineligible
- (W) Walk-on
- Injured
- Current redshirt

Roster
Last update: January 18, 2020

== Schedule and results ==
Date time, TV	Opponent	Result	Record	Site (attendance) city, state
Exhibition
October 31, 2019*; 7:00 pm	Earlham College	W 76–50		Skyhawk Arena (749); Martin, TN
Non-conference regular season
November 5, 2019*; 7:00 pm, ESPN+	St. Louis College of Pharmacy	W 106–48	1–0	Skyhawk Arena (823); Martin, TN
November 9, 2019*; 7:00 pm, ESPN+	ETSU	L 75–92	1–1	Skyhawk Arena (1,386); Martin, TN
November 13, 2019*; 7:00 pm, ESPN3	at Western Illinois	W 98–91	2–1	Western Hall (610); Macomb, IL
November 16, 2019*; 2:00 pm, ESPN3	at Wichita State; Cancún Challenge campus-site game	L 62–103	2–2	Charles Koch Arena (10,123); Wichita, KS
November 19, 2019*; 7:00 pm, ESPN+	at Northern Iowa; Cancún Challenge campus-site game	L 67–87	2–3	McLeod Center (3,128); Cedar Falls, IA
November 26, 2019*; 11:30 am, FloHoops	vs. Gardner–Webb; Cancún Challenge Mayan Division semifinals	L 64–81	2–4	Hard Rock Hotel Riviera Convention Center (253); Cancún, Mexico
November 27, 2019*; 11:30 am, FloHoops	vs. Boston University; Cancún Challenge Mayan Division	W 76–73	3–4	Hard Rock Hotel Riviera Convention Center (107); Cancún, Mexico
December 6, 2019*; 6:00 pm, ESPN3	at Central Michigan	L 75–84	3–5	McGuirk Arena (1,803); Mount Pleasant, MI
December 14, 2019*; 1:00 pm, ESPN+	at UNC Asheville	L 72–91	3–6	Kimmel Arena (1,395); Asheville, NC
December 18, 2019*; 9:00 pm, ESPNU	vs. No. 10 Baylor; The Battleground 2K19	L 63–91	3–7	Toyota Center; Houston, TX
December 29, 2019*; 2:00 pm, ESPN+	Mount St. Joseph	W 92–72	4–7	Skyhawk Arena (841); Martin, TN
Ohio Valley regular season
January 2, 2020; 7:00 pm, ESPN+	at Murray State	L 76–89	4–8 (0–1)	CFSB Center (3,314); Murray, KY
January 4, 2020; 4:00 pm, ESPN+	at Austin Peay	L 63–82	4–8 (0–2)	Dunn Center (1,028); Clarksville, TN
January 9, 2020; 7:30 pm, ESPN+	Tennessee State	W 87–74	5–9 (1–2)	Skyhawk Arena (1,945); Martin, TN
January 11, 2020; 4:00 pm, ESPN+	Belmont	L 78–85	5–10 (1–3)	Skyhawk Arena (1,652); Martin, TN
January 16, 2020; 7:30 pm, ESPN+	Murray State	L 62–84	5–11 (1–4)	Skyhawk Arena (3,209); Martin, TN
January 18, 2020; 4:00 pm, ESPN+	Austin Peay	L 81–92	5–12 (1–5)	Skyhawk Arena (1,392); Martin, TN
January 23, 2020; 7:30 pm, ESPN+	at Eastern Illinois	L 83–95	5–13 (1–6)	Lantz Arena (1,725); Charleston, IL
January 25, 2020; 4:30 pm, ESPN+	at SIU Edwardsville	W 79–76	6–13 (2–6)	Vadalabene Center (740); Edwardsville, IL
January 30, 2020; 6:30 pm, ESPN+	at Eastern Kentucky	L 86–99	6–14 (2–7)	McBrayer Arena (2,373); Richmond, KY
February 1, 2020; 2:00 pm, ESPN+	at Morehead State	L 77–85	6–15 (2–8)	Ellis Johnson Arena (2,078); Morehead, KY
February 6, 2020; 7:30 pm, ESPN+	Tennessee Tech	W 74–62	7–15 (3–8)	Skyhawk Arena (1,175); Martin, TN
February 8, 2020; 4:00 pm, ESPN+	Jacksonville State	L 61–75	7–16 (3–9)	Skyhawk Arena (1,717); Martin, TN
February 13, 2020; 7:15 pm, ESPN+	at Southeast Missouri State	L 72–74	7–17 (3–10)	Show Me Center (1,076); Cape Girardeau, MO
February 15, 2020; 4:00 pm, ESPN+	Eastern Illinois	W 80–79 ^{OT}	8–17 (4–10)	Skyhawk Arena (1,013); Martin, TN
February 20, 2020; 7:30 pm, ESPN+	at Tennessee Tech	L 65–78	8–18 (4–11)	Eblen Center (1,685); Cookeville, TN
February 22, 2020; 4:00 pm, ESPN+	at Jacksonville State	L 58–72	8–19 (4–12)	Pete Mathews Coliseum (1,752); Jacksonville, AL
February 27, 2020; 7:30 pm, ESPN+	SIU Edwardsville	L 75–90	8–20 (4–13)	Skyhawk Arena (813); Martin, TN
February 29, 2020; 4:00 pm, ESPN+	Southeast Missouri State	W 87–78	9–20 (5–13)	Skyhawk Arena (1,204); Martin, TN
*Non-conference game. ^{#}Rankings from AP Poll. (#) Tournament seedings in parentheses. All times are in Central.
