= 2019–20 Morehead State Eagles men's basketball team =

American college basketball season

2019–20 Morehead State Eagles men's basketball
- Conference: Ohio Valley Conference
- Record: 13–19 (7–11 OVC)
- Head coach: Preston Spradlin (3rd season)
- Assistant coaches: Jonathan Mattox; Dominic Lombardi; Scott Combs
- Home arena: Ellis Johnson Arena

2019–20 Ohio Valley Conference men's basketball standings
	Conf.				Overall
Team	W		L	PCT	W		L	PCT
Belmont †	15	–	3	.833	26	–	7	.788
Murray State	15	–	3	.833	23	–	9	.719
Austin Peay	14	–	4	.778	21	–	12	.636
Eastern Kentucky	12	–	6	.667	16	–	17	.485
Tennessee State	9	–	9	.500	18	–	15	.545
Eastern Illinois	9	–	9	.500	17	–	15	.531
Jacksonville State	8	–	10	.444	13	–	19	.406
Morehead State	7	–	11	.389	13	–	19	.406
Tennessee Tech	6	–	12	.333	9	–	22	.290
UT Martin	5	–	13	.278	9	–	20	.310
SIU Edwardsville	5	–	13	.278	8	–	23	.258
Southeast Missouri State	3	–	15	.167	7	–	24	.226
† 2020 OVC tournament winner

The 2019–20 Morehead State Eagles men's basketball team represented Morehead State University during the 2019–20 NCAA Division I men's basketball season. The Eagles, led by third-year head coach Preston Spradlin, played their home games at Ellis Johnson Arena in Morehead, Kentucky as members of the Ohio Valley Conference. They finished the season 13–19, 7–11 in OVC play to finish in eighth place. They lost in the first round of the OVC tournament to Tennessee State.

== Previous season ==
The Eagles finished the 2018–19 season 13–20, 8–10 in OVC play to finish in 5th place. They qualified for the OVC tournament, where they defeated SIU Edwardsville in the first-round before losing to Austin Peay in the quarterfinals.

== Roster ==
2019–20 Morehead State Eagles men's basketball team
Players
Coaches

Pos.	#	Name	Height	Weight	Year	Previous school	Hometown
F	0	Tyzhaun Claude	6 ft 8 in (2.03 m)	210 lb (95 kg)	Fr	Goldsboro HS; Moravian Prep	Goldsboro, NC
G	1	De'von Cooper	6 ft 4 in (1.93 m)	190 lb (86 kg)	Jr	Waggener HS	Louisville, KY
G	2	Jordan Walker	6 ft 0 in (1.83 m)	185 lb (84 kg)	Sr	Cathedral HS	Indianapolis, IN
F	3	James Baker	6 ft 6 in (1.98 m)	195 lb (88 kg)	Jr	Meade County HS	Brandenburg, KY
G	4	Tada Stricklen	6 ft 0 in (1.83 m)	180 lb (82 kg)	RS Fr	Corinth HS	Corinth, MS
G	5	KJ Hunt	6 ft 3 in (1.91 m)	180 lb (82 kg)	So	Bryant HS; College of Central Florida; McNeese State	Little Rock, AR
F	11	Julius Dixon	6 ft 7 in (2.01 m)	200 lb (91 kg)	Fr	Fayetteville HS	Fayetteville, TN
G	12	Justin Thomas	5 ft 11 in (1.8 m)	180 lb (82 kg)	RS Jr	Pike HS; Northern Illinois	Indianapolis, IN
F	13	Jaden Stanley–Williams	6 ft 7 in (2.01 m)	190 lb (86 kg)	So	Discovery HS; Columbia State CC	Great Falls, MT
F	22	LJ Bryan	6 ft 9 in (2.06 m)	250 lb (113 kg)	So	St. John's HS; FUMA; State Fair CC	Cheltenham, MD
G	23	Malik Riddle	6 ft 4 in (1.93 m)	175 lb (79 kg)	So	Rossville Christian Academy	Holly Springs, MS
G	32	Djimon Henson	6 ft 3 in (1.91 m)	195 lb (88 kg)	Sr	Lawrence North HS	Indianapolis, IN
G	55	Ta'lon Cooper	6 ft 4 in (1.93 m)	190 lb (86 kg)	Fr	Dorman HS	Spartanburg, SC

Head coach

- Preston Spradlin (Alice Lloyd)

Assistant coach(es)

- Jonathan Mattox (Emmanuel)
- Dominic Lombardi (Indiana–Pennsylvania)
- Scott Combs (Austin Peay)

Legend

- (C) Team captain
- (S) Suspended
- (I) Ineligible
- (W) Walk-on
- Injured
- Current redshirt

Roster
Last update: October 24, 2019

== Schedule and results ==
Date time, TV	Rank^{#}	Opponent^{#}	Result	Record	Site (attendance) city, state
Exhibition
Oct 29, 2019*; 7:00 pm		Kentucky Christian	W 86–47		Ellis Johnson Arena; Morehead, KY
Non-conference regular season
Nov 5, 2019*; 7:00 pm, ESPN+		Samford	W 90–86	1–0	Ellis Johnson Arena (2,043); Morehead, KY
Nov 7, 2019*; 11:00 am, ESPN+		Spalding University	W 92–44	2–0	Ellis Johnson Arena (1,155); Morehead, KY
Nov 14, 2019*; 7:00 pm, ESPN+		at Presbyterian	W 77–55	3–0	Templeton Physical Education Center (498); Clinton, SC
Nov 16, 2019*; 6:00 pm, ESPN+		Maryland Eastern Shore; CBE Hall of Fame Classic campus-site game	W 76–53	4–0	Ellis Johnson Arena (1,645); Morehead, KY
Nov 20, 2019*; 8:00 pm, SECN+		at Missouri; CBE Hall of Fame Classic campus-site game	L 52–70	4–1	Mizzou Arena (8,142); Columbia, MO
Nov 22, 2019*; 7:00 pm, FS1		at Butler; CBE Hall of Fame Classic campus-site game	L 50–68	4–2	Hinkle Fieldhouse (7,707); Indianapolis, IN
Nov 26, 2019*; 7:30 pm, FloSports		at William & Mary; CBE Hall of Fame Classic campus-site game	L 84–95	4–3	Kaplan Arena (2,882); Williamsburg, VA
Nov 30, 2019*; 12:00 pm, ESPN+		at North Alabama	L 57–67	4–4	Flowers Hall (312); Florence, AL
Dec 4, 2019*; 7:00 pm, ESPN+		IUPUI	W 56–51	5–4	Ellis Johnson Arena (1,776); Morehead, KY
Dec 7, 2019*; 7:00 pm, NBCSCH		at Illinois State	L 50–61	5–5	Redbird Arena (4,634); Normal, IL
Dec 16, 2019*; 7:00 pm, ESPN+		Marshall	L 62–89	5–6	Ellis Johnson Arena (2,134); Morehead, KY
Dec 21, 2019*; 1:00 pm		at Ohio	L 76–82	5–7	Convocation Center (3,021); Athens, OH
Dec 28, 2019*; 12:00 pm, ESPN+		Alice Lloyd	W 102–46	6–7	Ellis Johnson Arena (1,059); Morehead, KY
OVC Regular Season
Jan 2, 2020; 9:00 pm, ESPNU		Jacksonville State	L 72–76	6–8 (0–1)	Ellis Johnson Arena (1,472); Morehead, KY
Jan 4, 2020; 3:00 pm, ESPN+		Tennessee Tech	W 83–72	7–8 (1–1)	Ellis Johnson Arena (1,518); Morehead, KY
Jan 9, 2020; 7:00 pm, ESPN+		SIU Edwardsville	W 83–77	8–8 (2–1)	Ellis Johnson Arena (1,157); Morehead, KY
Jan 11, 2020; 3:00 pm, ESPN+		Eastern Illinois	W 69–66	9–8 (3–1)	Ellis Johnson Arena (1,474); Morehead, KY
Jan 16, 2020; 8:30 pm, ESPN+		at Tennessee State	L 48–64	9–9 (3–2)	Gentry Complex (4,273); Nashville, TN
Jan 18, 2020; 5:00 pm, ESPN+		at Belmont	L 59–77	9–10 (3–3)	Curb Event Center (2,204); Nashville, TN
Jan 23, 2020; 8:30 pm, ESPN+		at Tennessee Tech	L 59–71	9–11 (3–4)	Eblen Center (1,679); Cookeville, TN
Jan 25, 2020; 5:00 pm, ESPN+		at Jacksonville State	L 51–72	9–12 (3–5)	Pete Mathews Coliseum (1,856); Jacksonville, AL
Jan 30, 2020; 7:00 pm, ESPN+		Southeast Missouri State	W 90–74	10–12 (4–5)	Ellis Johnson Arena (2,092); Morehead, KY
Feb 1, 2020; 3:00 pm, ESPN+		UT Martin	W 2,078	11–12 (5–5)	Ellis Johnson Arena (85–77); Morehead, KY
Feb 6, 2020; 8:00 pm, ESPN+		at SIU Edwardsville	W 58–49	12–12 (6–5)	Vadalabene Center (856); Edwardsville, IL
Feb 8, 2020; 4:15 pm, ESPN+		at Eastern Illinois	L 65–71	12–13 (6–6)	Lantz Arena (1,515); Charleston, IL
Feb 13, 2020; 7:00 pm, ESPN+		Eastern Kentucky	L 71–78	12–14 (6–7)	Ellis Johnson Arena (2,933); Morehead, KY
Feb 15, 2020; 5:00 pm, ESPN+		at Murray State	L 57–85	12–15 (6–8)	CFSB Center (4,816); Murray, KY
Feb 20, 2020; 7:00 pm, ESPN+		Belmont	L 67–80	12–16 (6–9)	Ellis Johnson Arena (2,118); Morehead, KY
Feb 22, 2020; 3:00 pm, ESPN+		Tennessee State	W 66–63	13–16 (7–9)	Ellis Johnson Arena (2,348); Morehead, KY
Feb 27, 2020; 9:00 pm, ESPN+		at Austin Peay	L 58–67	13–17 (7–10)	Dunn Center (1,931); Clarksville, TN
Feb 29, 2020; 7:00 pm, ESPN+		at Eastern Kentucky	L 76–80	13–18 (7–11)	McBrayer Arena (3,249); Richmond, KY
Ohio Valley tournament
Mar 4, 2020; 7:30 pm, ESPN+	(8)	vs. (5) Tennessee State; First round	L 67–74 ^{OT}	13–19	Ford Center (593); Evansville, IN
*Non-conference game. (#) Tournament seedings in parentheses. All times are in Eastern Time.
