= 2020 Ohio Valley Conference men's basketball tournament =

- Classification: Division I
- Season: 2019–20
- Teams: 8
- Site: Ford Center; Evansville, Indiana
- Champions: Belmont (3rd title)
- Winning coach: Casey Alexander (1st title)
- MVP: Nick Muszynski (Belmont)
- Television: ESPN+, ESPNU, ESPN2

2019–20 Ohio Valley Conference men's basketball standings
	Conf.				Overall
Team	W		L	PCT	W		L	PCT
Belmont †	15	–	3	.833	26	–	7	.788
Murray State	15	–	3	.833	23	–	9	.719
Austin Peay	14	–	4	.778	21	–	12	.636
Eastern Kentucky	12	–	6	.667	16	–	17	.485
Tennessee State	9	–	9	.500	18	–	15	.545
Eastern Illinois	9	–	9	.500	17	–	15	.531
Jacksonville State	8	–	10	.444	13	–	19	.406
Morehead State	7	–	11	.389	13	–	19	.406
Tennessee Tech	6	–	12	.333	9	–	22	.290
UT Martin	5	–	13	.278	9	–	20	.310
SIU Edwardsville	5	–	13	.278	8	–	23	.258
Southeast Missouri State	3	–	15	.167	7	–	24	.226
† 2020 OVC tournament winner

The 2020 Ohio Valley Conference men's basketball tournament was the final event of the 2019–20 NCAA Division I men's basketball season in the Ohio Valley Conference. The tournament was held March 4 through March 7, 2020 at the Ford Center in Evansville, Indiana.

Belmont defeated Murray State in the championship game of the tournament to receive the conference's automatic bid to the NCAA tournament.

== Seeds ==
Only the top eight teams in the conference qualified for the tournament. Teams were seeded by record within the conference, with a tiebreaker system to seed teams with identical conference records. The No. 1 and No. 2 seeds receive double byes to the semifinals. The No. 3 and No. 4 seeds receive a single bye to the quarterfinals.

Seed	School	Conf.	Tiebreaker
1	Belmont	15–3	3–0 vs TSU/EIU
2	Murray State	15–3	3–1 vs TSU/EIU
3	Austin Peay	14–4	
4	Eastern Kentucky	12–6	
5	Tennessee State	9–9	1–0 vs. Eastern Illinois
6	Eastern Illinois	9–9	0–1 vs. Tennessee State
7	Jacksonville State	8–10	
8	Morehead State	7–11	

== Schedule ==
Game	Time	Matchup	Score	Television
First Round – Wednesday, March 4
1	6:30 pm	No. 5 Tennessee State vs. No. 8 Morehead State	74–67 ^{OT}	ESPN+
2	8:30 pm	No. 6 Eastern Illinois vs. No. 7 Jacksonville State	67–61	ESPN+
Quarterfinals – Thursday, March 5
3	6:30 pm	No. 4 Eastern Kentucky vs. No. 5 Tennessee State	58–48	ESPN+
4	8:30 pm	No. 3 Austin Peay vs. No. 6 Eastern Illinois	76–65	ESPN+
Semifinals – Friday, March 6
5	7:00 pm	No. 1 Belmont vs. No. 4 Eastern Kentucky	60–50	ESPNU
6	9:00 pm	No. 2 Murray State vs. No. 3 Austin Peay	73–61	ESPNU
Championship – Saturday, March 7
7	7:00 pm	No. 1 Belmont vs. No. 2 Murray State	76–75	ESPN2
All game times in Central Time Zone.

== Bracket ==
First round Wednesday, March 4 ESPN+
5	Tennessee State	74*
8	Morehead State	67
6	Eastern Illinois	67
7	Jacksonville State	61

Quarterfinals; Thursday, March 5 ESPN+
4	Eastern Kentucky	58
5	Tennessee State	48
3	Austin Peay	76
6	Eastern Illinois	65

Semifinals; Friday, March 6 ESPNU
1	Belmont	60
4	Eastern Kentucky	50
2	Murray State	73
3	Austin Peay	61

Championship; Saturday, March 7 ESPN2
1	Belmont	76
2	Murray State	75

* denotes number of overtime periods
