= 2019–20 Eastern Illinois Panthers men's basketball team =

American college basketball season

2019–20 Eastern Illinois Panthers men's basketball
- Conference: Ohio Valley Conference
- Record: 17–15 (9–9 OVC)
- Head coach: Jay Spoonhour (8th season)
- Assistant coaches: Rand Chappell; Justin Brown; Matt Bringman
- Home arena: Lantz Arena

2019–20 Ohio Valley Conference men's basketball standings
	Conf.				Overall
Team	W		L	PCT	W		L	PCT
Belmont †	15	–	3	.833	26	–	7	.788
Murray State	15	–	3	.833	23	–	9	.719
Austin Peay	14	–	4	.778	21	–	12	.636
Eastern Kentucky	12	–	6	.667	16	–	17	.485
Tennessee State	9	–	9	.500	18	–	15	.545
Eastern Illinois	9	–	9	.500	17	–	15	.531
Jacksonville State	8	–	10	.444	13	–	19	.406
Morehead State	7	–	11	.389	13	–	19	.406
Tennessee Tech	6	–	12	.333	9	–	22	.290
UT Martin	5	–	13	.278	9	–	20	.310
SIU Edwardsville	5	–	13	.278	8	–	23	.258
Southeast Missouri State	3	–	15	.167	7	–	24	.226
† 2020 OVC tournament winner

The 2019–20 Eastern Illinois Panthers men's basketball team represented Eastern Illinois University during the 2019–20 NCAA Division I men's basketball season. The Panthers, led by eighth-year head coach Jay Spoonhour, played their home games at Lantz Arena as members of the Ohio Valley Conference (OVC). They finished the season 17–15, 9–9 in OVC play, to finish in a tie for fifth place. They defeated Jacksonville State in the first round of the OVC tournament before losing in the quarterfinals to Austin Peay.

== Previous season ==
The Panthers finished the 2018–19 season 14–18, 7–11 in OVC play, to finish in sixth place. They lost to UT Martin in the first round of the OVC tournament.

== Preseason ==
In a vote of conference coaches and sports information directors, Eastern Illinois was picked to finish in 7th place in the OVC.

=== Preseason All-OVC team ===
The Panthers had one player selected to the preseason all-OVC team.

- Josiah Wallace – Guard

== Roster ==
2019–20 Eastern Illinois Panthers men's basketball team
Players
Coaches

Pos.	#	Name	Height	Weight	Year	Hometown
G	1	Kashawn Charles	6 ft 1 in (1.85 m)	185 lb (84 kg)	Jr	Wyandanch, NY
F	2	Jordan Skipper-Brown	6 ft 6 in (1.98 m)	230 lb (104 kg)	Jr	Killeen, TX
G	3	Mack Smith	6 ft 2 in (1.88 m)	185 lb (84 kg)	Jr	Indianapolis, IN
G	4	Marvin Johnson	6 ft 6 in (1.98 m)	190 lb (86 kg)	Jr	Ardmore, OK
G	5	Shareef Smith	5 ft 10 in (1.78 m)	180 lb (82 kg)	Sr	Madison, WI
G	11	Logan Koch	6 ft 1 in (1.85 m)	200 lb (91 kg)	Sr	Shawnee, KS
G	12	Dondre Duffus	6 ft 2 in (1.88 m)	185 lb (84 kg)	GS	Palm Beach, FL
G	13	Shawn Wilson	5 ft 11 in (1.8 m)	165 lb (75 kg)	Sr	Harvey, IL
F	21	Braxton Shaw	6 ft 7 in (2.01 m)	210 lb (95 kg)	Sr	Fontana, CA
G	22	Josiah Wallace	6 ft 4 in (1.93 m)	185 lb (84 kg)	Jr	Marshall, IL
G	25	Deang Deang	6 ft 4 in (1.93 m)	185 lb (84 kg)	Jr	Madison, WI
F	32	JaQualis Matlock	6 ft 5 in (1.96 m)	225 lb (102 kg)	Sr	Hopkinsville, KY
G	35	George Dixon	6 ft 5 in (1.96 m)	230 lb (104 kg)	Jr	Milwaukee, WI

Head coach

- Jay Spoonhour (Pittsburg State)

Assistant coach(es)

- Rand Chappell (Missouri State)
- Justin Brown (Southwest Baptist)
- Matt Bringman (Palm Beach Atlantic)

Legend

- (C) Team captain
- (S) Suspended
- (I) Ineligible
- (W) Walk-on
- Injured
- Current redshirt

Roster
Last update: July 1, 2024

== Schedule and results ==
Date time, TV	Rank^{#}	Opponent^{#}	Result	Record	Site (attendance) city, state
Exhibition
October 30, 2019*; 7:00 p.m.		Missouri–St. Louis	W 66–51		Lantz Arena; Charleston, IL
Non-conference regular season
November 5, 2019*; 7:00 p.m., FSSW+		at No. 13 Texas Tech	L 60–85	0–1	United Supermarkets Arena (15,098); Lubbock, TX
November 8, 2019*; 7:00 p.m., BTN+		at Wisconsin	L 52–65	0–2	Kohl Center (17,106); Madison, WI
November 12, 2019*; 7:00 p.m., ESPN+		Chicago State	W 98–34	1–2	Lantz Arena (1,198); Charleston, IL
November 18, 2019*; 7:00 p.m., ESPN+		Indiana Northwest; Incarnate Word MTE Event	W 114–61	2–2	Lantz Arena (1,232); Charleston, IL
November 22, 2019*; 2:00 p.m.		vs. St. Francis (Ill.); Incarnate Word MTE Event	W 87–47	3–2	McDermott Center (130); San Antonio, TX
November 23, 2019*; 12:00 p.m., UIW TV		vs. Bethune–Cookman; Incarnate Word MTE Event	L 63–66	3–3	McDermott Center (126); San Antonio, TX
November 24, 2019*; 6:00 p.m., UIW Pay-Per-View		at Incarnate Word; Incarnate Word MTE Event	W 72–63	4–3	McDermott Center (349); San Antonio, TX
December 4, 2019*; 6:00 p.m., YouTube		at Purdue Fort Wayne	L 69–74	4–4	Allen County War Memorial Coliseum (1,059); Fort Wayne, IN
December 7, 2019*; 3:15 p.m., ESPN+		Green Bay	W 93–80	5–4	Lantz Arena (1,488); Charleston, IL
December 14, 2019*; 7:00 p.m., ESPN+		at Milwaukee	W 75–68	6–4	UW–Milwaukee Panther Arena (1,101); Milwaukee, WI
December 16, 2019*; 7:00 p.m.		at Western Illinois	W 85–47	7–4	Western Hall (347); Macomb, IL
December 21, 2019*; 7:00 p.m., ESPN3		at Grand Canyon	L 63–85	7–5	GCU Arena (6,634); Phoenix, AZ
Ohio Valley regular season
January 2, 2020; 7:30 p.m., ESPN+		at Tennessee State	L 79–84	7–6 (0–1)	Gentry Complex; Nashville, TN
January 4, 2020; 4:00 p.m., ESPN+		at Belmont	L 55–87	7–7 (0–2)	Curb Event Center (1,905); Nashville, TN
January 9, 2020; 6:30 p.m., ESPN+		at Eastern Kentucky	L 74–77	7–8 (0–3)	McBrayer Arena; Richmond, KY
January 11, 2020; 2:00 p.m., ESPN+		at Morehead State	L 66–69	7–9 (0–4)	Ellis Johnson Arena (1,474); Morehead, KY
January 16, 2020; 7:30 p.m., ESPN+		Jacksonville State	W 70–69	8–9 (1–4)	Lantz Arena (1,460); Charleston, IL
January 18, 2020; 3:15 p.m., ESPN+		Tennessee Tech	W 84–59	9–9 (2–4)	Lantz Arena (1,525); Charleston, IL
January 23, 2020; 7:30 p.m., ESPN+		UT Martin	W 95–83	10–9 (3–4)	Lantz Arena (1,725); Charleston, IL
January 25, 2020; 3:15 p.m., ESPN+		Southeast Missouri State	W 61–59	11–9 (4–4)	Lantz Arena (1,538); Charleston, IL
January 30, 2020; 7:00 p.m., ESPN+		at Murray State	L 70–73	11–10 (4–5)	CFSB Center (4,530); Murray, KY
February 1, 2020; 4:00 p.m., ESPN+		at Austin Peay	L 64–68	11–11 (4–6)	Dunn Center (2,128); Clarksville, TN
February 6, 2020; 7:30 p.m., ESPN+		Eastern Kentucky	L 84–91	11–12 (4–7)	Lantz Arena (1,400); Charleston, IL
February 8, 2020; 3:15 p.m., ESPN+		Morehead State	W 71–65	12–12 (5–7)	Lantz Arena (1,515); Charleston, IL
February 13, 2020; 7:30 p.m., ESPN+		SIU Edwardsville	L 74–76	12–13 (5–8)	Lantz Arena (1,111); Charleston, IL
February 15, 2020; 4:00 p.m., ESPN+		at UT Martin	L 79–80 ^{OT}	12–14 (5–9)	Skyhawk Arena (1,013); Martin, TN
February 20, 2020; 7:30 p.m., ESPN+		Murray State	W 63–60	13–14 (6–9)	Lantz Arena (1,444); Charleston, IL
February 22, 2020; 3:15 p.m., ESPN+		Austin Peay	W 83–80 ^{OT}	14–14 (7–9)	Lantz Arena (1,633); Charleston, IL
February 27, 2020; 7:15 p.m., ESPN+		at Southeast Missouri State	W 72–70	15–14 (8–9)	Show Me Center (1,775); Cape Girardeau, MO
February 29, 2020; 2:00 p.m., ESPN+		at SIU Edwardsville	W 70–52	16–14 (9–9)	Vadalabene Center; Edwardsville, IL
Ohio Valley Conference tournament
March 4, 2020; 8:30 p.m., ESPN+	(6)	vs. (7) Jacksonville State; First round	W 67–61	17–14	Ford Center (593); Evansville, IN
March 5, 2020; 8:30 p.m., ESPN+	(6)	vs. (3) Austin Peay; Quarterfinals	L 65–76	17–15	Ford Center (1,005); Evansville, IN
*Non-conference game. ^{#}Rankings from AP poll. (#) Tournament seedings in parentheses. All times are in Central.
