= 2019–20 Jacksonville State Gamecocks men's basketball team =

American college basketball season

2019–20 Jacksonville State Gamecocks men's basketball
- Conference: Ohio Valley Conference
- Record: 13–19 (8–10 OVC)
- Head coach: Ray Harper (4th season)
- Assistant coaches: Chase Richardson; Jake Morton; Tommy Wade
- Home arena: Pete Mathews Coliseum

2019–20 Ohio Valley Conference men's basketball standings
	Conf.				Overall
Team	W		L	PCT	W		L	PCT
Belmont †	15	–	3	.833	26	–	7	.788
Murray State	15	–	3	.833	23	–	9	.719
Austin Peay	14	–	4	.778	21	–	12	.636
Eastern Kentucky	12	–	6	.667	16	–	17	.485
Tennessee State	9	–	9	.500	18	–	15	.545
Eastern Illinois	9	–	9	.500	17	–	15	.531
Jacksonville State	8	–	10	.444	13	–	19	.406
Morehead State	7	–	11	.389	13	–	19	.406
Tennessee Tech	6	–	12	.333	9	–	22	.290
UT Martin	5	–	13	.278	9	–	20	.310
SIU Edwardsville	5	–	13	.278	8	–	23	.258
Southeast Missouri State	3	–	15	.167	7	–	24	.226
† 2020 OVC tournament winner

The 2019–20 Jacksonville State Gamecocks men's basketball team represented Jacksonville State University in the 2019–20 NCAA Division I men's basketball season. The Gamecocks, led by fourth-year head coach Ray Harper, played their home games at the Pete Mathews Coliseum in Jacksonville, Alabama as members of the Ohio Valley Conference. They finished the season 13–19, 8–10 in OVC play to finish in seventh place. They lost in the first round of the OVC tournament to Eastern Illinois.

== Previous season ==
The Gamecocks finished the 2018–19 season 24–9 overall, 15–3 in OVC play to finish in third place. In the OVC tournament, they defeated UT Martin in the quarterfinals before losing to Murray State in the semifinals.

== Roster ==
2019–20 Jacksonville State Gamecocks men's basketball team
Players
Coaches

Pos.	#	Name	Height	Weight	Year	Hometown
G	0	Derrick Cook	6 ft 5 in (1.96 m)	200 lb (91 kg)	Jr	Fairburn, Georgia
G	1	Cam Jones	6 ft 6 in (1.98 m)	190 lb (86 kg)	RS Fr	Memphis, Tennessee
F	2	Jacara Cross	6 ft 8 in (2.03 m)	240 lb (109 kg)	Sr	Atlanta, Georgia
C	3	Maros Zeliznak	6 ft 11 in (2.11 m)	265 lb (120 kg)	So	Košice, Slovakia
PG	4	Ty Hudson	6 ft 1 in (1.85 m)	200 lb (91 kg)	Sr	Baton Rouge, Louisiana
G	5	Justin Murphy	6 ft 3 in (1.91 m)	197 lb (89 kg)	Jr	Geraldine, Alabama
F	10	Juwan Perdue	6 ft 6 in (1.98 m)	200 lb (91 kg)	Fr	Sumter, South Carolina
G/F	11	Kayne Henry	6 ft 7 in (2.01 m)	210 lb (95 kg)	Jr	London, England
G	13	Elias Harden	6 ft 5 in (1.96 m)	180 lb (82 kg)	Jr	East Point, Georgia
G	15	Derek St. Hilaire	5 ft 11 in (1.8 m)	180 lb (82 kg)	Jr	Atlanta, Georgia
F	24	Martin Roub	6 ft 10 in (2.08 m)	235 lb (107 kg)	Jr	Kolín, Czech Republic
G	31	Marek Welsch	5 ft 11 in (1.8 m)	180 lb (82 kg)	Fr	Holice, Czech Republic
G	33	De'Torrion Ware	6 ft 4 in (1.93 m)	200 lb (91 kg)	So	Hopkinsville, Kentucky

Head coach

- Ray Harper (Kentucky Wesleyan)

Assistant coach(es)

- Chase Richardson (Western Kentucky)
- Jake Morton (Miami (FL))
- Tommy Wade (Southeast Missouri State)

Legend

- (C) Team captain
- (S) Suspended
- (I) Ineligible
- (W) Walk-on
- Injured
- Current redshirt

Roster
Last update: December 4, 2019

== Schedule and results ==
Date time, TV	Rank^{#}	Opponent^{#}	Result	Record	Site (attendance) city, state
Exhibition
October 29, 2019*; 7:30 pm		Montevallo	W 73–68		Pete Mathews Coliseum (1,096); Jacksonville, AL
Non-conference regular season
November 5, 2019*; 7:00 pm, ESPN3		at SMU	L 65–74	0–1	Moody Coliseum (4,010); University Park, TX
November 12, 2019*; 7:30 pm, ESPN+		Brescia	W 125–55	1–1	Pete Mathews Coliseum (1,883); Jacksonville, AL
November 17, 2019*; 11:00 am, ESPN+		at VCU; Emerald Coast Classic campus-site game	L 65–93	1–2	Siegel Center (7,637); Richmond, VA
November 23, 2019*; 6:30 pm, BTN		at Purdue; Emerald Coast Classic campus-site game	L 49–81	1–3	Mackey Arena (14,804); West Lafayette, IN
November 29, 2019*; 11:00 am		vs. Chicago State; Emerald Coast Classic semifinals	W 71–62	2–3	The Arena at NWFSC (230); Niceville, FL
November 29, 2019*; 12:30 pm		vs. Chattanooga; Emerald Coast Classic finals	L 60–63	2–4	The Arena at NWFSC (215); Niceville, FL
December 3, 2019*; 6:00 pm, ESPN+		at George Mason	L 60–67	2–5	EagleBank Arena (2,652); Fairfax, Virginia
December 7, 2019*; 4:00 pm		at Alabama A&M	L 62–67	2–6	Elmore Gymnasium (780); Normal, AL
December 11, 2019*; 7:30 pm, ESPN+		Troy	L 55–60	2–7	Pete Mathews Coliseum (2,034); Jacksonville, AL
December 16, 2019*; 7:30 pm, ESPN+		Evansville	W 85–59	3–7	Pete Mathews Coliseum (2,155); Jacksonville, AL
December 18, 2019*; 7:30 pm, ESPN+		Delaware State	W 92–80	4–7	Pete Mathews Coliseum (1,674); Jacksonville, AL
December 21, 2019*; 12:00 pm, SECN+		at No. 21 Tennessee	L 53–75	4–8	Thompson–Boling Arena (18,247); Knoxville, TN
December 28, 2019*; 4:00 pm, ESPN+		Carver	W 120–56	5–8	Pete Mathews Coliseum (726); Jacksonville, AL
Ohio Valley regular season
January 2, 2020; 8:00 pm, ESPNU		at Morehead State	W 76–72	6–8 (1–0)	Ellis Johnson Arena (1,472); Morehead, KY
January 4, 2020; 3:00 pm, ESPN+		at Eastern Kentucky	W 80–71	7–8 (2–0)	McBrayer Arena (1,719); Richmond, KY
January 9, 2020; 8:00 pm, ESPNU		Murray State	L 68–72	7–9 (2–1)	Pete Mathews Coliseum (3,139); Jacksonville, AL
January 11, 2020; 4:00 pm, ESPN+		Austin Peay	L 67–71	7–10 (2–2)	Pete Mathews Coliseum (969); Jacksonville, AL
January 16, 2020; 7:30 pm, ESPN+		at Eastern Illinois	L 69–70	7–11 (2–3)	Lantz Arena (1,460); Charleston, IL
January 18, 2020; 1:00 pm, ESPN+		at SIU Edwardsville	W 64–56	8–11 (3–3)	Vadalabene Center (1,061); Edwardsville, IL
January 23, 2020; 7:30 pm, ESPN+		Eastern Kentucky	L 77–81	8–12 (3–4)	Pete Mathews Coliseum (1,046); Jacksonville, AL
January 25, 2020; 4:00 pm, ESPN+		Morehead State	W 72–51	9–12 (4–4)	Pete Mathews Coliseum (1,856); Jacksonville, AL
January 30, 2020; 7:30 pm, ESPN+		Tennessee State	L 62–72	9–13 (4–5)	Pete Mathews Coliseum (1,630); Jacksonville, AL
February 1, 2020; 4:00 pm, ESPN+		Belmont	L 64–78	9–14 (4–6)	Pete Mathews Coliseum (1,298); Jacksonville, AL
February 6, 2020; 7:15 pm, ESPN+		at Southeast Missouri State	L 72–76	9–15 (4–7)	Show Me Center (1,256); Cape Girardeau, MO
February 8, 2020; 4:00 pm, ESPN+		at UT Martin	W 75–61	10–15 (5–7)	Skyhawk Arena (1,717); Martin, TN
February 13, 2020; 6:00 pm, ESPN+		at Tennessee Tech	L 74–75	10–16 (5–8)	Eblen Center (888); Cookeville, TN
February 15, 2020; 5:00 pm, ESPN+		at Belmont	L 84–101	10–17 (5–9)	Curb Event Center (3,388); Nashville, TN
February 20, 2020; 7:30 pm, ESPN+		Southeast Missouri State	W 65–58	11–17 (6–9)	Pete Mathews Coliseum (1,256); Jacksonville, AL
February 22, 2020; 4:00 pm, ESPN+		UT Martin	W 72–58	12–17 (7–9)	Pete Mathews Coliseum (1,752); Jacksonville, AL
February 27, 2020; 7:30 pm, ESPN+		at Tennessee State	L 55–65	12–18 (7–10)	Gentry Complex (4,004); Nashville, TN
February 29, 2020; 7:00 pm, ESPN+		Tennessee Tech	W 75–71	13–18 (8–10)	Pete Mathews Coliseum (885); Jacksonville, AL
Ohio Valley Conference tournament
March 4, 2020; 8:30 pm, ESPN+	(7)	vs. (6) Eastern Illinois; First round	L 61–67	13–19	Ford Center (593); Evansville, IN
*Non-conference game. ^{#}Rankings from AP Poll. (#) Tournament seedings in parentheses. All times are in Central.
