= 2019–20 Tennessee State Tigers basketball team =

American college basketball season

2019–20 Tennessee State Tigers basketball

Las Vegas Invitational visitors bracket champions
- Conference: Ohio Valley Conference
- Record: 18–15 (9–9 OVC)
- Head coach: Brian Collins (2nd season)
- Assistant coaches: Ben Walker; Jerry Nichols; Russ Willemsen
- Home arena: Gentry Complex

2019–20 Ohio Valley Conference men's basketball standings
	Conf.				Overall
Team	W		L	PCT	W		L	PCT
Belmont †	15	–	3	.833	26	–	7	.788
Murray State	15	–	3	.833	23	–	9	.719
Austin Peay	14	–	4	.778	21	–	12	.636
Eastern Kentucky	12	–	6	.667	16	–	17	.485
Tennessee State	9	–	9	.500	18	–	15	.545
Eastern Illinois	9	–	9	.500	17	–	15	.531
Jacksonville State	8	–	10	.444	13	–	19	.406
Morehead State	7	–	11	.389	13	–	19	.406
Tennessee Tech	6	–	12	.333	9	–	22	.290
UT Martin	5	–	13	.278	9	–	20	.310
SIU Edwardsville	5	–	13	.278	8	–	23	.258
Southeast Missouri State	3	–	15	.167	7	–	24	.226
† 2020 OVC tournament winner

The 2019–20 Tennessee State Tigers basketball team represented Tennessee State University in the 2019–20 NCAA Division I men's basketball season. The Tigers, led by second-year head coach Brian Collins, played their home games at the Gentry Complex in Nashville, Tennessee as members of the Ohio Valley Conference (OVC). They finished the season 18–15, 9–9 in OVC play, to finish in a tie for fifth place. They defeated Morehead State in the first round of the OVC tournament before losing in the quarterfinals to Eastern Kentucky. They accepted an invitation to participate in the 2020 CollegeInsider.com Postseason Tournament (CIT) and were set to host a first-round game. However, the CIT was cancelled amid the COVID-19 pandemic.

== Previous season ==
The Tigers finished the 2018–19 season 9–21 overall, 6–12 during OVC play, and finishing in a four-way tie for seventh place. Since only the top eight teams in the conference qualify for the OVC tournament, tiebreakers left Tennessee State as the No. 9 seed, preventing them from participating.

== Roster ==
2019–20 Tennessee State Tigers men's basketball team
Players
Coaches

Pos.	#	Name	Height	Weight	Year	Hometown
G	0	Mark Freeman	5 ft 10 in (1.78 m)	160 lb (73 kg)	Fr	Memphis, TN
G	1	Michael Littlejohn	5 ft 10 in (1.78 m)	160 lb (73 kg)	Sr	Muskegon, MI
G	2	Carlos Marshall Jr.	6 ft 6 in (1.98 m)	210 lb (95 kg)	RS So	Memphis, TN
G	3	Amorey Womack	6 ft 1 in (1.85 m)	185 lb (84 kg)	Fr	St. Louis, MO
G	4	Wesley Harris	6 ft 9 in (2.06 m)	200 lb (91 kg)	GS	Jackson, MS
G	5	Jon Brown	6 ft 8 in (2.03 m)	180 lb (82 kg)	Jr	Miami, FL
F	10	Shakem Johnson	6 ft 7 in (2.01 m)	210 lb (95 kg)	Jr	Youngstown, OH
F	11	Emmanuel Egbuta	6 ft 7 in (2.01 m)	230 lb (104 kg)	Sr	The Bronx, NY
G	12	Monty Johal	6 ft 3 in (1.91 m)	185 lb (84 kg)	RS Fr	Springfield, MO
F	13	Mason Green	6 ft 10 in (2.08 m)	220 lb (100 kg)	Jr	Ellenwood, GA
G	20	Donnie Malone	6 ft 2 in (1.88 m)	185 lb (84 kg)	Jr	Memphis, TN
F	22	Jy'lan Washington	6 ft 9 in (2.06 m)	210 lb (95 kg)	RS Sr	Smyrna, TN
G	23	Ravel Moody	6 ft 6 in (1.98 m)	200 lb (91 kg)	Jr	Denver, CO
F	34	Ben Kone'	6 ft 9 in (2.06 m)	235 lb (107 kg)	RS Jr	San Francisco, CA

Head coach

- Brian Collins (Belmont)

Assistant coach(es)

- Ben Walker (Creighton)
- Jerry Nichols (Arkansas State)
- Russ Willemsen (Lee)

Legend

- (C) Team captain
- (S) Suspended
- (I) Ineligible
- (W) Walk-on
- Injured
- Current redshirt

Roster
Last update: July 13, 2024

== Schedule and results ==
Date time, TV	Rank^{#}	Opponent^{#}	Result	Record	Site (attendance) city, state
Non-conference regular season
November 5, 2019*; 7:00 p.m.		Alabama A&M	W 106–66	1–0	Gentry Complex (5,638); Nashville, TN
November 9, 2019*; 3:30 p.m., SoConDN		at Chattanooga	L 57–59	1–1	McKenzie Arena (2,694); Chattanooga, TN
November 12, 2019*; 2:00 p.m., ESPN+		Lipscomb	W 79–78	2–1	Gentry Complex (4,582); Nashville, TN
November 18, 2019*; 7:30 p.m., ESPN+		Fisk; Battle of Jefferson Street	W 99–65	3–1	Gentry Complex (5,994); Nashville, TN
November 21, 2019*; 7:00 p.m., FSSW+		at No. 12 Texas Tech; Las Vegas Invitational campus-site game	L 57–72	3–2	United Supermarkets Arena (12,584); Lubbock, TX
November 25, 2019*; 9:00 p.m.		at San Diego State; Las Vegas Invitational campus-site game	L 49–62	3–3	Viejas Arena (10,430); San Diego, CA
November 28, 2019*; 1:00 p.m.		vs. Cal Poly; Las Vegas Invitational visitors bracket semifinal	W 82–72	4–3	Orleans Arena; Las Vegas, NV
November 29, 2019*; 3:30 p.m.		vs. North Florida; Las Vegas Invitational visitors bracket final	W 81–73	5–3	Orleans Arena; Las Vegas, NV
December 6, 2019*; 12:00 p.m., ESPN+		Chicago State	W 80–74	6–3	Gentry Complex (594); Nashville, TN
December 10, 2019*; 6:30 p.m.		at Little Rock	L 62–86	6–4	Jack Stephens Center (1,080); Little Rock, AR
December 15, 2019*; 1:00 p.m., ESPN+		at Fordham	W 66–61	7–4	Rose Hill Gymnasium (1,524); The Bronx, NY
December 18, 2019*; 6:00 p.m.		at Indiana State	L 72–78	7–5	Hulman Center (3,123); Terre Haute, IN
December 21, 2019*; 1:00 p.m., ESPN+		Blue Mountain; Battle of the Blues	W 86–71	8–5	Gentry Complex (310); Nashville, TN
Ohio Valley regular season
January 2, 2020; 7:30 p.m., ESPN+		Eastern Illinois	W 84–79	9–5 (1–0)	Gentry Complex; Nashville, TN
January 4, 2020; 4:00 p.m., ESPN+		SIU Edwardsville	W 79–74	10–5 (2–0)	Gentry Complex (905); Nashville, TN
January 9, 2020; 7:30 p.m., ESPN+		at UT Martin	L 74–87	10–6 (2–1)	Skyhawk Arena (1,945); Martin, TN
January 11, 2020; 4:00 p.m., ESPN+		at Southeast Missouri State	W 75–73	11–6 (3–1)	Show Me Center (1,012); Cape Girardeau, MO
January 16, 2020; 7:30 p.m., ESPN+		Morehead State	W 64–48	12–6 (4–1)	Gentry Complex (4,273); Nashville, TN
January 18, 2020; 4:00 p.m., ESPN+		Eastern Kentucky	L 88–92	12–7 (4–2)	Gentry Complex (3,982); Nashville, TN
January 23, 2020; 8:00 p.m., ESPN+		at Austin Peay	L 74–99	12–8 (4–3)	Dunn Center (2,033); Clarksville, TN
January 25, 2020; 7:00 p.m., ESPN+		at Murray State	L 64–76	12–9 (4–4)	CFSB Center (4,925); Murray, KY
January 30, 2020; 7:30 p.m., ESPN+		at Jacksonville State	W 72–62	13–9 (5–4)	Pete Mathews Coliseum (1,630); Jacksonville, AL
February 1, 2020; 7:30 p.m., ESPN+		at Tennessee Tech	W 72–67	14–9 (6–4)	Eblen Center (1,702); Cookeville, TN
February 6, 2020; 7:30 p.m., ESPN3		Austin Peay	W 70–68	15–9 (7–4)	Gentry Complex (3,872); Nashville, TN
February 8, 2020; 7:30 p.m., ESPN+		Murray State	L 65–73	15–10 (7–5)	Gentry Complex (3,102); Nashville, TN
February 13, 2020; 7:00 p.m., ESPN+		at Belmont	L 51–74	15–11 (7–6)	Curb Event Center (3,240); Nashville, TN
February 15, 2020; 7:30 p.m., ESPN+		Tennessee Tech	W 70–55	16–11 (8–6)	Gentry Complex (2,221); Nashville, TN
February 20, 2020; 7:30 p.m., ESPN+		at Eastern Kentucky	L 62–83	16–12 (8–7)	McBrayer Arena (2,975); Richmond, KY
February 22, 2020; 3:00 p.m., ESPN+		at Morehead State	L 63–66	16–13 (8–8)	Ellis Johnson Arena (2,348); Morehead, KY
February 27, 2020; 7:30 p.m., ESPN+		Jacksonville State	W 65–55	17–13 (9–8)	Gentry Complex (4,004); Nashville, TN
February 29, 2020; 7:30 p.m., ESPN+		Belmont	L 65–72	17–14 (9–9)	Gentry Complex; Nashville, TN
Ohio Valley Conference tournament
March 4, 2020; 6:30 p.m., ESPN+	(5)	vs. (8) Morehead State; First round	W 74–67 ^{OT}	18–14	Ford Center (593); Evansville, IN
March 5, 2020; 7:30 p.m., ESPN+	(5)	vs. (4) Eastern Kentucky; Quarterfinals	L 48–58	18–15	Ford Center (1,005); Evansville, IN
CIT
March 17, 2020; 7:00 p.m., ESPN+		First round Coach John McLendon Classic	Cancelled due to the COVID-19 pandemic		Gentry Complex; Nashville, TN
*Non-conference game. ^{#}Rankings from AP poll. (#) Tournament seedings in parentheses. All times are in Central.
