= Nick Muszynski =

American basketball player (born 1998)

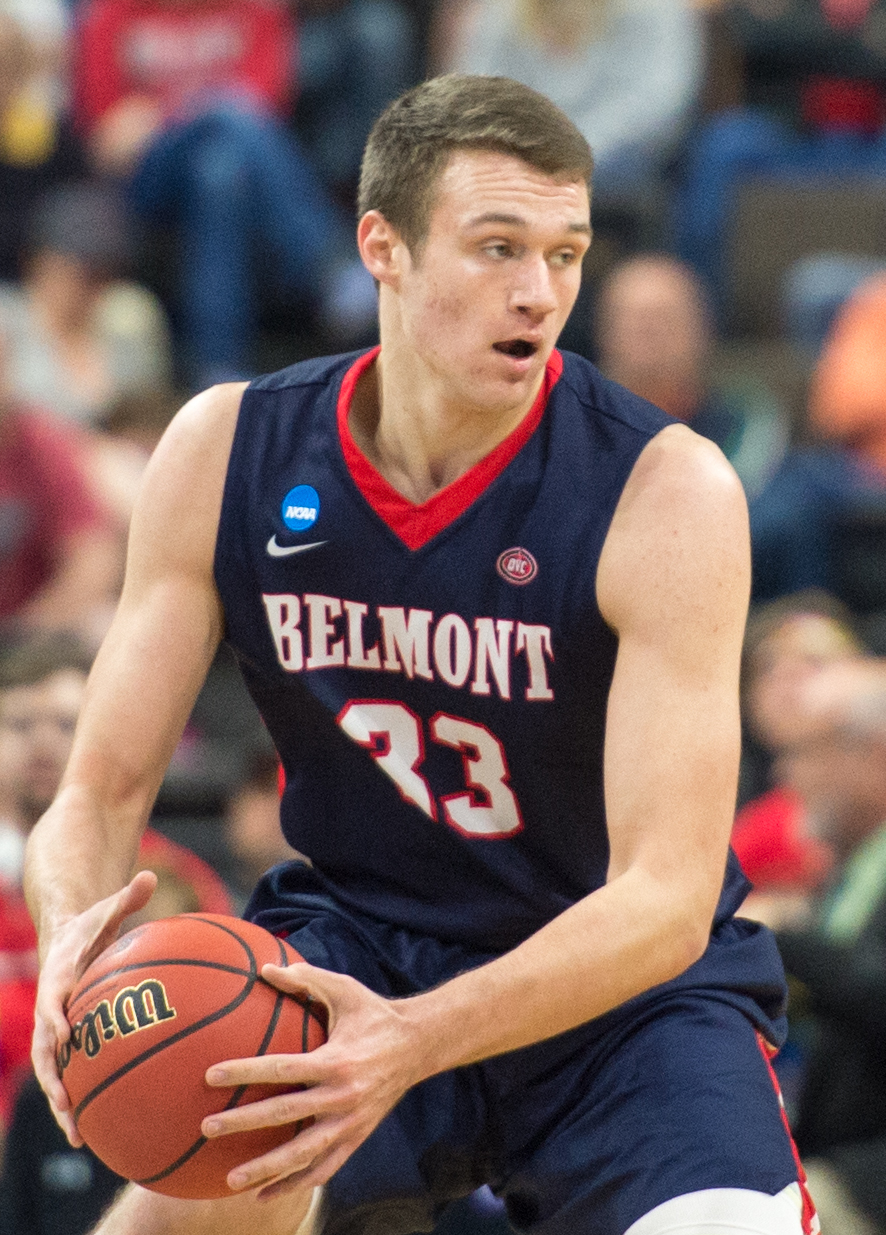
- Muszynski with Belmont in 2019

No. 33 – MLP Academics Heidelberg
- Position: Center
- League: ProA

Personal information
- Born: November 19, 1998 (age 27) Pickerington, Ohio, U.S.
- Listed height: 6 ft 9 in (2.06 m)
- Listed weight: 245 lb (111 kg)

Career information
- High school: Saint Charles Prep (Columbus, Ohio)
- College: Belmont (2018–2022)
- NBA draft: 2022: undrafted
- Playing career: 2018–present

Career history
- 2022: Astoria Bydgoszcz
- 2023–2024: VfL Kirchheim Knights
- 2024–2025: Rip City Remix
- 2025: Wellington Saints
- 2025–2026: Limburg United

Career highlights
- NZNBL champion (2025); 4× First-team All-OVC (2019–2022); OVC Freshman of the Year (2019); OVC tournament MVP (2020)
- Stats at NBA.com
- Stats at Basketball Reference

Nicholas Muszynski (born November 19, 1998) is an American professional basketball player for MLP Academics Heidelberg of the ProA. He played college basketball for the Belmont Bruins. After failing to make the draft invites he went undrafted and went overseas.

== Early life ==
Growing up, Muszynski played volleyball and swam, but began focusing on basketball in sixth grade. He admired Tim Duncan for his fundamentals, modelling his game after him. Muszynski played basketball for Saint Charles Preparatory School in Columbus, Ohio He was a member of the junior varsity team in his sophomore season, before being promoted to the varsity team and averaging 11.5 points and seven rebounds per game as a junior. In his senior season, Muszynski averaged 16 points, 11.3 rebounds and 2.5 blocks per game, leading his team to a 24–3 record. He committed to playing college basketball for Belmont over offers from Air Force, Stony Brook and UNC Asheville.

== College career ==
Muszynski redshirted his first season at Belmont. In his debut game, he posted 18 points, 7 rebounds and 5 blocks against Illinois State. As a freshman, he averaged 14.7 points, 5.8 rebounds, 2.7 assists and 2.2 blocks per game. He earned Ohio Valley Conference (OVC) Freshman of the Year and First Team All-OVC honors. On November 26, 2019, Muszynski posted a career-high 30 points, seven rebounds and four blocks in an 87–82 loss to Eastern Washington. On January 4, 2020, he recorded 25 points, 16 rebounds and five assists in an 87–55 win against Eastern Illinois. Muszynski helped Belmont win the 2020 OVC tournament and was named MVP after posting 25 points and eight rebounds against Murray State in the final. He averaged 15.3 points, 6.4 rebounds and 1.6 blocks per game as a sophomore, repeating on the First Team All-OVC. In his junior season opener against Howard on November 26, Muszynski became Belmont's NCAA Division I career blocks leader. As a junior, he averaged 15 points, 5.6 rebounds and 1.6 blocks per game, earning First Team All-OVC honors for a third straight year. Muszynski was again named to the First Team All-OVC as a senior.

== Professional career ==
=== Astoria Bydgoszcz (2022) ===
After going undrafted in the 2022 NBA draft, Muszynski signed with Astoria Bydgoszcz of the Polish Basketball League on August 5, 2022, but was released on November 30.

=== VfL Kirchheim Knights (2023–2024) ===
On January 23, 2023, Muszynski signed with VfL Kirchheim Knights of the German ProA. In 16 games to finish the 2022–23 season, he averaged 7.6 points, 3.8 rebounds and 1.0 assists per game. He returned to Kirchheim for the 2023–24 season and averaged 12.2 points, 6.3 rebounds, 2.6 assists and 1.8 blocks in 39 games.

=== Rip City Remix (2024–2025) ===
On October 17, 2024, Muszynski signed with the Portland Trail Blazers, but was waived the next day. On October 28, he joined the Rip City Remix of the NBA G League. He was waived by the Remix on January 20, 2025.

=== Wellington Saints (2025) ===
On February 28, 2025, Muszynski signed with the Wellington Saints of the New Zealand National Basketball League (NZNBL) for the 2025 season.

=== Limburg United (2025–2026) ===
On June 16, 2025, Muszynski signed with Limburg United of the BNXT League for the 2025–26 season.

=== USC Heidelberg (2026–present) ===
On July 27, 2026, he signed with MLP Academics Heidelberg of the ProA.

== Career statistics ==
Legend
GP	Games played	GS	Games started	MPG	Minutes per game
FG%	Field goal percentage	3P%	3-point field goal percentage	FT%	Free throw percentage
RPG	Rebounds per game	APG	Assists per game	SPG	Steals per game
BPG	Blocks per game	PPG	Points per game	**Bold**	Career high

=== College ===
Year	Team	GP	GS	MPG	FG%	3P%	FT%	RPG	APG	SPG	BPG	PPG
2017–18	Belmont	Redshirt										
2018–19	Belmont	32	**32**	24.9	**.604**	**.364**	**.779**	5.8	**2.7**	**.6**	**2.2**	14.7
2019–20	Belmont	**33**	**32**	24.8	.596	.327	.660	**6.4**	1.7	.4	1.6	**15.3**
2020–21	Belmont	27	27	**25.0**	.586	.077	.734	5.6	1.7	.2	1.6	15.0
Career		92	91	24.9	.596	.298	.723	5.9	2.0	.4	1.8	15.0
