= 2021–22 Southeast Missouri State Redhawks men's basketball team =

American college basketball season

2021–22 Southeast Missouri State Redhawks men's basketball
- Conference: Ohio Valley Conference
- Record: 14–18 (8–9 OVC)
- Head coach: Brad Korn (2nd season)
- Assistant coaches: Keith Pickens; Dustin Yoder; Sam McMahon
- Home arena: Show Me Center

2021–22 Ohio Valley Conference men's basketball standings
	Conf.				Overall
Team	W		L	PCT	W		L	PCT
No. 20 Murray State †	18	–	0	1.000	31	–	3	.912
Belmont	15	–	3	.833	25	–	8	.758
Morehead State	13	–	5	.722	23	–	11	.676
Southeast Missouri State	8	–	9	.471	14	–	18	.438
Tennessee State	8	–	10	.444	14	–	18	.438
Austin Peay	8	–	10	.444	12	–	17	.414
Tennessee Tech	7	–	10	.412	11	–	21	.344
SIU Edwardsville	5	–	13	.278	11	–	21	.344
UT Martin	4	–	14	.222	8	–	22	.267
Eastern Illinois	3	–	15	.167	5	–	26	.161
† 2022 OVC tournament winner Rankings from AP poll

The 2021–22 Southeast Missouri State Redhawks men's basketball team represented Southeast Missouri State University in the 2021–22 NCAA Division I men's basketball season. The Redhawks, led by second-year head coach Brad Korn, played their home games at the Show Me Center in Cape Girardeau, Missouri as members of the Ohio Valley Conference.

== Previous season ==
In a season limited due to the ongoing COVID-19 pandemic, the Redhawks finished the 2020–21 season 11–16, 9–11 in OVC play to finish in seventh place. They lost to Morehead State in the quarterfinals of the OVC tournament.

== Roster ==
2021–22 Southeast Missouri State Redhawks men's basketball team
Players
Coaches

Pos.	#	Name	Height	Weight	Year	Previous school	Hometown
G	1	Phillip Russell	5 ft 10 in (1.78 m)	165 lb (75 kg)	Fr	Saint Louis	St. Louis, MO
F	2	Chase Thompson	6 ft 7 in (2.01 m)	230 lb (104 kg)	Fr	Western Nebraska CC	Omaha, NE
G	3	Eric Reed, Jr.	6 ft 2 in (1.88 m)	190 lb (86 kg)	Jr	Howard College	Baton Rouge, LA
F	4	Adam Larson	6 ft 9 in (2.06 m)	180 lb (82 kg)	Fr	Fennimore HS	Fennimore, WI
G	5	Chris Harris	6 ft 3 in (1.91 m)	205 lb (93 kg)	RS Jr	John A. Logan College	Antioch, IL
F	10	Manny Patterson	6 ft 8 in (2.03 m)	220 lb (100 kg)	Sr	Green Bay	Chicago, IL
G	11	DQ Nicholas	6 ft 1 in (1.85 m)	180 lb (82 kg)	So	Scotland Prep School	Atlanta, GA
G	13	Parker Long	6 ft 2 in (1.88 m)	175 lb (79 kg)	So	Maryville	Sikeston, MO
C	14	Nate Johnson	6 ft 9 in (2.06 m)	250 lb (113 kg)	Jr	Seminole State College	Broward County, FL
G	21	Nana Akenten	6 ft 6 in (1.98 m)	215 lb (98 kg)	RS Jr	Nebraska	Bolingbrook, IL
G	25	Nygal Russell	6 ft 4 in (1.93 m)	205 lb (93 kg)	Jr	ASPIRE Academy	Houston, TX
F	31	Nolan Taylor	6 ft 7 in (2.01 m)	260 lb (118 kg)	RS Sr	Cal Poly	Keller, TX
F	32	Sam Thompson	6 ft 10 in (2.08 m)	250 lb (113 kg)	Fr	Francis Howell HS	St. Charles, MO
G	33	Dylan Branson	6 ft 5 in (1.96 m)	220 lb (100 kg)	Fr	Mehlville HS	St. Louis, MO

Head coach

- Brad Korn (Southern Illinois)

Assistant coach(es)

- Keith Pickens (Missouri State)
- Dustin Yoder (Illinois)
- Sam McMahon (Delaware)

Legend

- (C) Team captain
- (S) Suspended
- (I) Ineligible
- (W) Walk-on
- Injured
- Current redshirt

Roster
Last update: November 2, 2021

== Schedule and results ==
Date time, TV	Rank^{#}	Opponent^{#}	Result	Record	Site (attendance) city, state
Non-conference regular season
November 9, 2021*; 7:00 pm, ESPN+		at Missouri State	W 99–94	1–0	JQH Arena (4,190); Springfield, MO
November 13, 2021*; 5:30 pm, ESPN+		Youngstown State	L 79–97	1–1	Show Me Center (1,280); Cape Girardeau, MO
November 19, 2021*; 6:30 pm, ESPN+		Arkansas State	L 60–72	1–2	Show Me Center (1,145); Cape Girardeau, MO
November 22, 2021*; 7:00 pm, ESPN+		Missouri Baptist	W 71–63	2–2	Show Me Center (789); Cape Girardeau, MO
November 26, 2021*; 12:00 pm		at Incarnate Word; Incarnate Word Tournament	W 79–76	3–2	McDermott Center; San Antonio, TX
November 27, 2021*; 2:00 pm		vs. Portland; Incarnate Word Tournament	L 68–74	3–3	McDermott Center (100); San Antonio, TX
November 28, 2021*; 12:00 pm		vs. Montana State; Incarnate Word Tournament	L 68–75	3–4	McDermott Center; San Antonio, TX
December 4, 2021*; 2:00 pm, ESPN+		Webster	W 76–64	4–4	Show Me Center (672); Cape Girardeau, MO
December 8, 2021*; 6:30 pm, ESPN+		Evansville	W 75–73	5–4	Show Me Center (690); Cape Girardeau, MO
December 11, 2021*; 12:00 pm, ESPN+		at Purdue Fort Wayne	L 65–78	5–5	Allen County War Memorial Coliseum (1,073); Fort Wayne, IN
December 15, 2021*; 7:00 pm, ESPN+		at Southern Illinois	L 55–80	5–6	Banterra Center (4,030); Carbondale, IL
December 18, 2021*; 7:00 pm		at Pepperdine	L 77–83	5–7	Firestone Fieldhouse (437); Malibu, CA
December 21, 2021*; 9:00 pm, ESPN+		at California Baptist	L 68–84	5–8	CBU Events Center (2,220); Riverside, CA
Ohio Valley regular season
December 30, 2021; 7:00 pm, ESPN+		at Murray State	L 81–106	5–9 (0–1)	CFSB Center (3,630); Murray, KY
January 1, 2022; 4:00 pm, ESPN+		Austin Peay	W 98–79	6–9 (1–1)	Show Me Center (580); Cape Girardeau, MO
January 6, 2022; 7:00 pm, ESPN+		at Belmont	L 62–102	6–10 (1–2)	Curb Event Center (278); Nashville, TN
January 8, 2022; 3:00 pm, ESPN+		at Tennessee State	L 84–95	6–11 (1–3)	Gentry Complex (269); Nashville, TN
January 13, 2022; 7:00 pm, ESPN+		Tennessee Tech	Cancelled due to COVID-19 issues		Show Me Center; Cape Girardeau, MO
January 20, 2022; 7:00 pm, ESPN+		Tennessee State	W 85–63	7–11 (2–3)	Show Me Center (640); Cape Girardeau, MO
January 22, 2022; 3:30 pm, ESPN+		at Eastern Illinois	W 87–58	8–11 (3–3)	Lantz Arena (869); Charleston, IL
January 27, 2022; 7:00 pm, ESPNU		Morehead State	L 73–74 ^{OT}	8–12 (3–4)	Show Me Center (1,325); Cape Girardeau, MO
January 29, 2022; 4:00 pm, ESPN+		SIU Edwardsville	W 85–77	9–12 (4–4)	Show Me Center (935); Cape Girardeau, MO
February 3, 2022; 8:00 pm, ESPN+		at UT Martin	L 63–84	9–13 (4–5)	Skyhawk Arena (506); Martin, TN
February 5, 2022; 4:00 pm, ESPN+		Eastern Illinois	W 63–56	10–13 (5–5)	Show Me Center (924); Cape Girardeau, MO
February 7, 2022; 7:00 pm, ESPN+		at SIU Edwardsville; Rescheduled from January 15	W 76–47	11–13 (6–5)	First Community Arena (565); Edwardsville, IL
February 10, 2022; 7:30 pm, ESPN+		at Austin Peay	L 66–74	11–14 (6–6)	Dunn Center (1,253); Clarksville, TN
February 12, 2022; 4:00 pm, ESPN+		Belmont	L 72–81	11–15 (6–7)	Show Me Center (1,469); Cape Girardeau, MO
February 17, 2022; 7:30 pm, ESPN+		at Tennessee Tech	L 94–98	11–16 (6–8)	Eblen Center (1,009); Cookeville, TN
February 19, 2022; 3:00 pm, ESPN+		at Morehead State	W 92–84	12–16 (7–8)	Ellis Johnson Arena (2,511); Morehead, KY
February 24, 2022; 7:00 pm, ESPN+		UT Martin	W 76–69	13–16 (8–8)	Show Me Center (742); Cape Girardeau, MO
February 26, 2022; 4:00 pm, ESPN+		No. 19 Murray State	L 68–70	13–17 (8–9)	Show Me Center (2,934); Cape Girardeau, MO
Ohio Valley tournament
March 3, 2022; 6:30 pm, ESPN+	(4)	vs. (5) Tennessee State; Quarterfinals	W 79–55	14–17	Ford Center (0); Evansville, IN
March 4, 2022; 7:00 pm, ESPNU	(4)	vs. (1) No. 22 Murray State; Semifinals	L 74–88	14–18	Ford Center (4,160); Evansville, IN
*Non-conference game. ^{#}Rankings from AP Poll. (#) Tournament seedings in parentheses. All times are in Central.
