= 2021–22 Murray State Racers men's basketball team =

American college basketball season

2021–22 Murray State Racers men's basketball
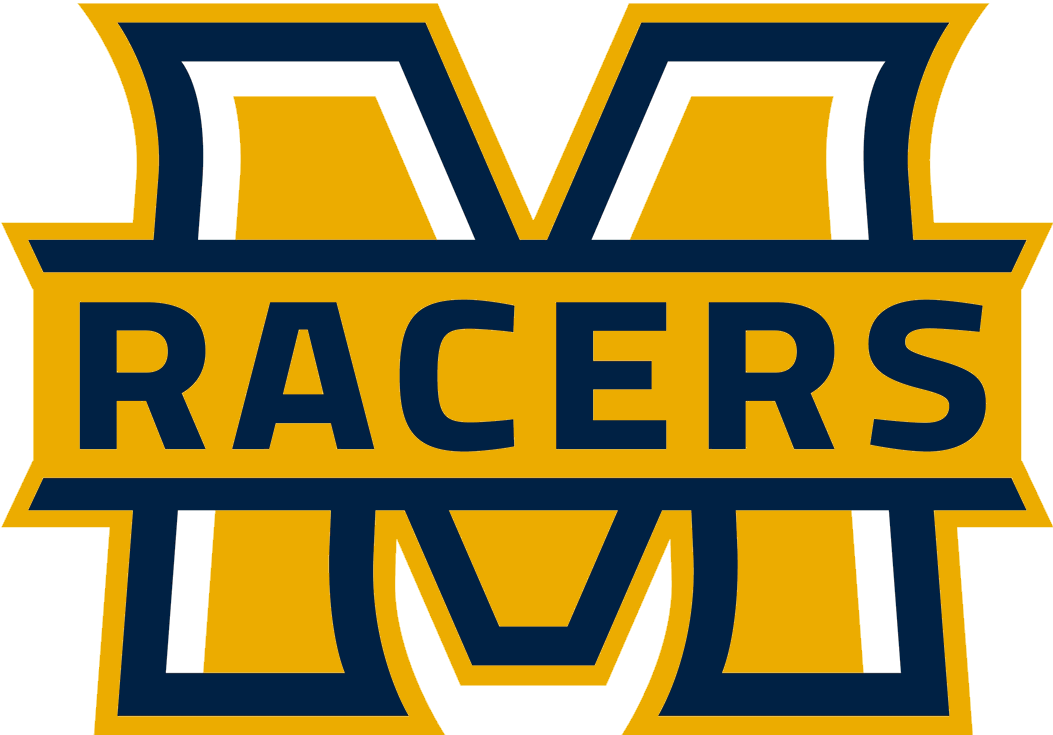

Ohio Valley regular season and tournament champions

NCAA tournament, Second Round
- Conference: Ohio Valley Conference

Ranking
- Coaches: No. 22
- AP: No. 20
- Record: 31–3 (18–0 OVC)
- Head coach: Matt McMahon (7th season)
- Assistant coaches: Tim Kaine; Casey Long; Ronrico White
- Home arena: CFSB Center

2021–22 Ohio Valley Conference men's basketball standings
	Conf.				Overall
Team	W		L	PCT	W		L	PCT
No. 20 Murray State †	18	–	0	1.000	31	–	3	.912
Belmont	15	–	3	.833	25	–	8	.758
Morehead State	13	–	5	.722	23	–	11	.676
Southeast Missouri State	8	–	9	.471	14	–	18	.438
Tennessee State	8	–	10	.444	14	–	18	.438
Austin Peay	8	–	10	.444	12	–	17	.414
Tennessee Tech	7	–	10	.412	11	–	21	.344
SIU Edwardsville	5	–	13	.278	11	–	21	.344
UT Martin	4	–	14	.222	8	–	22	.267
Eastern Illinois	3	–	15	.167	5	–	26	.161
† 2022 OVC tournament winner Rankings from AP poll

The 2021–22 Murray State Racers men's basketball team represented Murray State University in the 2021–22 NCAA Division I men's basketball season. The Racers, led by seventh-year head coach Matt McMahon, played their home games at the CFSB Center in Murray, Kentucky as members of the Ohio Valley Conference. They finished the season 31–3, 18–0 in OVC play to finish as regular season champions. As the No. 1 seed, they defeated Southeast Missouri State and Morehead State to win the OVC tournament. They received the conference's automatic bid to the NCAA tournament as the No. 7 seed in the East Region, where they defeated San Francisco in the first round before losing to Saint Peter's in the second round.

On January 7, 2022, Murray State announced that the season was the last season for the team in the OVC as they will join the Missouri Valley Conference in July 2022.

On March 21, head coach Matt McMahon left the school to take the head coaching job at LSU. On March 28, the school named former Murray State and Iowa State head coach Steve Prohm the team's new head coach. Prohm previously coached Murray State from 2006 to 2011 as an assistant and as head coach from 2011 to 2015.

== Previous season ==
In a season limited due to the ongoing COVID-19 pandemic, the Racers finished the 2020–21 season 13–13, 10–10 in OVC play to finish in a tie for fifth place. In the OVC tournament, they were defeated by Jacksonville State in the quarterfinals.

== Roster ==
2021–22 Murray State Racers men's basketball team
Players
Coaches

Pos.	#	Name	Height	Weight	Year	Previous school	Hometown
F	0	KJ Williams	6 ft 10 in (2.08 m)	245 lb (111 kg)	Jr	Cleveland Central HS	Cleveland, MS
G	1	DaQuan Smith	6 ft 1 in (1.85 m)	185 lb (84 kg)	So	Holly Springs HS	Holly Springs, MS
G	2	Trae Hannibal	6 ft 2 in (1.88 m)	220 lb (100 kg)	So	South Carolina	Elliott, SC
G	4	Dionte Bostick	6 ft 2 in (1.88 m)	190 lb (86 kg)	Fr	East Lake HS	Clearwater, FL
G	10	Tevin Brown	6 ft 5 in (1.96 m)	175 lb (79 kg)	Jr	Fairhope HS	Fairhope, AL
F	11	Matt Smith	6 ft 6 in (1.98 m)	225 lb (102 kg)	Fr	Independence HS	Charlotte, NC
G	13	Carter Collins	6 ft 3 in (1.91 m)	190 lb (86 kg)	Sr	Davidson	Chapel Hill, NC
G	14	Justice Hill	6 ft 0 in (1.83 m)	170 lb (77 kg)	So	Salt Lake CC	Little Rock, AR
F	22	Elijah Farr	6 ft 8 in (2.03 m)	240 lb (109 kg)	So	Olney Central College	Kansas City, MO
G	25	Rod Thomas	6 ft 0 in (1.83 m)	185 lb (84 kg)	So	Paducah Tilghman HS	Paducah, KY
F	31	Jordan Skipper-Brown	6 ft 6 in (1.98 m)	230 lb (104 kg)	Sr	Eastern Illinois	Little Rock, AR
F	32	Nicholas McMullen	6 ft 8 in (2.03 m)	235 lb (107 kg)	Fr	Ben L. Smith HS	Greensboro, NC
G	33	Jackson Sivills	6 ft 6 in (1.98 m)	200 lb (91 kg)	Fr	McCracken County HS	Paducah, KY
F	55	DJ Burns	6 ft 7 in (2.01 m)	210 lb (95 kg)	So	Sophie B. Wright HS; Southern	New Orleans, LA

Head coach

- Matt McMahon (Appalachian State)

Assistant coach(es)

- Tim Kaine (Winthrop)
- Casey Long (Chattanooga)
- Ronrico White (Chattanooga)

Legend

- (C) Team captain
- (S) Suspended
- (I) Ineligible
- (W) Walk-on
- Injured
- Current redshirt

Roster
Last update: December 22, 2021

== Schedule and results ==
Date time, TV	Rank^{#}	Opponent^{#}	Result	Record	Site (attendance) city, state
Non-conference regular season
November 9, 2021*; 7:00 pm, ESPN+		Cumberland	W 109–77	1–0	CFSB Center (3,109); Murray, KY
November 13, 2021*; 7:00 pm, ESPN+		Bellarmine	W 78–59	2–0	CFSB Center (3,613); Murray, KY
November 16, 2021*; 7:00 pm, ESPN3		at Illinois State	W 77–65	3–0	Redbird Arena (2,094); Normal, IL
November 22, 2021*; 4:30 pm, FloSports		vs. East Tennessee State; Naples Invitational First Round	L 58–66	3–1	Community School of Naples (317); Naples, FL
November 23, 2021*; 1:30 pm, FloSports		vs. Long Beach State; Naples Invitational Consolation 2nd Round	W 80–43	4–1	Community School of Naples (307); Naples, FL
November 24, 2021*; 1:30 pm, FloSports		vs. James Madison; Naples Invitational 5th place game	W 74–62	5–1	Community School of Naples (117); Naples, FL
November 29, 2021*; 7:00 pm, ESPN+		Campbellsville	W 98–61	6–1	CFSB Center (2,829); Murray, KY
December 4, 2021*; 7:00 pm, ESPN+		Middle Tennessee	W 93–87	7–1	CFSB Center (4,114); Murray, KY
December 10, 2021*; 7:00 pm, ESPN+		at Memphis	W 74–72	8–1	FedExForum (13,607); Memphis, TN
December 15, 2021*; 7:00 pm, ESPN+		Tennessee Wesleyan	W 118–48	9–1	CFSB Center (3,515); Murray, KY
December 18, 2021*; 7:00 pm, ESPN+		Chattanooga	W 87–76	10–1	CFSB Center (3,791); Murray, KY
December 22, 2021*; 5:00 pm, SECN		at No. 12 Auburn	L 58–71	10–2	Auburn Arena (9,121); Auburn, AL
Ohio Valley regular season
December 30, 2021; 7:00 pm, ESPN+		Southeast Missouri State	W 106–81	11–2 (1–0)	CFSB Center (3,630); Murray, KY
January 8, 2022; 3:00 pm, ESPN+		at SIU Edwardsville	W 74–69	12–2 (2–0)	First Community Arena (537); Edwardsville, IL
January 13, 2022; 7:00 pm, ESPN+		Tennessee State	W 67–44	13–2 (3–0)	CFSB Center (3,313); Murray, KY
January 15, 2022; 4:00 pm, ESPN+		at Belmont	W 82–60	14–2 (4–0)	Curb Event Center (2,432); Nashville, TN
January 17, 2022; 3:30 pm, ESPN+		at Eastern Illinois; Rescheduled from January 6	W 72–46	15–2 (5–0)	Lantz Arena (1,117); Charleston, IL
January 20, 2022; 7:00 pm, ESPN+		Eastern Illinois	W 91–51	16–2 (6–0)	CFSB Center (3,820); Murray, KY
January 22, 2022; 7:00 pm, ESPN+		UT Martin	W 74–66	17–2 (7–0)	CFSB Center (4,722); Murray, KY
January 24, 2022; 7:00 pm, ESPN+		Tennessee Tech; Rescheduled from January 1	W 79–53	18–2 (8–0)	CFSB Center (3,524); Murray, KY
January 27, 2022; 7:30 pm, ESPN+		at Tennessee Tech	W 80–75	19–2 (9–0)	Eblen Center (840); Cookeville, TN
January 29, 2022; 4:00 pm, ESPN+		Morehead State	W 77–66	20–2 (10–0)	CFSB Center (5,529); Murray, KY
February 3, 2022; 4:30 pm, ESPN+		at Austin Peay	W 65–53	21–2 (11–0)	Dunn Center (971); Clarksville, TN
February 5, 2022; 7:00 pm, ESPN+		SIU Edwardsville	W 79–59	22–2 (12–0)	CFSB Center (5,305); Murray, KY
February 10, 2022; 7:30 pm, ESPN+	No. 23	at Tennessee State	W 73–62	23–2 (13–0)	Gentry Complex (4,567); Nashville, TN
February 12, 2022; 3:00 pm, ESPN+	No. 23	at Morehead State	W 57–53	24–2 (14–0)	Ellis Johnson Arena (3,960); Morehead, KY
February 17, 2022; 7:00 pm, ESPNU	No. 21	Austin Peay	W 91–56	25–2 (15–0)	CFSB Center (6,217); Murray, KY
February 19, 2022; 3:30 pm, ESPN+	No. 21	at UT Martin	W 62–60	26–2 (16–0)	Skyhawk Arena (3,257); Martin, TN
February 24, 2022; 8:00 pm, ESPNU	No. 19	Belmont	W 76–43	27–2 (17–0)	CFSB Center (8,041); Murray, KY
February 26, 2022; 4:00 pm, ESPN+	No. 19	at Southeast Missouri State	W 70–68	28–2 (18–0)	Show Me Center (2,934); Cape Girardeau, MO
Ohio Valley tournament
March 4, 2022; 7:00 pm, ESPNU	(1) No. 22	vs. (4) Southeast Missouri State; Semifinals	W 88–74	29–2	Ford Center (4,160); Evansville, IN
March 5, 2022; 7:30 pm, ESPN2	(1) No. 22	vs. (3) Morehead State; Championship	W 71–67	30–2	Ford Center (6,491); Evansville, IN
NCAA tournament
March 17, 2022*; 8:40 pm, CBS	(7 E) No. 20	vs. (10 E) San Francisco; First Round	W 92–87 ^{OT}	31–2	Gainbridge Fieldhouse (16,828); Indianapolis, IN
March 19, 2022*; 6:45 pm, CBS	(7 E) No. 20	vs. (15 E) Saint Peter's; Second Round	L 60–70	31–3	Gainbridge Fieldhouse (17,838); Indianapolis, IN
*Non-conference game. ^{#}Rankings from AP Poll. (#) Tournament seedings in parentheses. All times are in Central.

== Rankings ==
Ranking movements Legend: ██ Increase in ranking ██ Decrease in ranking — = Not ranked RV = Received votes
	Week																				
Poll	Pre	1	2	3	4	5	6	7	8	9	10	11	12	13	14	15	16	17	18	19	Final
AP	—	—	—	—	—	—	—	—	—	—	—	RV	RV	23	21	19	22	19	22	20	Not released
Coaches	—	—^	—	—	—	—	—	—	—	—	RV	RV	RV	24	21	21	22	19	22	20	22

*AP does not release post-NCAA Tournament rankings.
^Coaches did not release a Week 1 poll.
