= 2021–22 SIU Edwardsville Cougars men's basketball team =

American college basketball season

2021–22 SIU Edwardsville Cougars men's basketball
- Conference: Ohio Valley Conference
- Record: 11–21 (4–14 OVC)
- Head coach: Brian Barone (3rd season)
- Assistant coaches: Charles Wells; Troy Pierce; Colin Schneider
- Home arena: First Community Arena

2021–22 Ohio Valley Conference men's basketball standings
	Conf.				Overall
Team	W		L	PCT	W		L	PCT
No. 20 Murray State †	18	–	0	1.000	31	–	3	.912
Belmont	15	–	3	.833	25	–	8	.758
Morehead State	13	–	5	.722	23	–	11	.676
Southeast Missouri State	8	–	9	.471	14	–	18	.438
Tennessee State	8	–	10	.444	14	–	18	.438
Austin Peay	8	–	10	.444	12	–	17	.414
Tennessee Tech	7	–	10	.412	11	–	21	.344
SIU Edwardsville	5	–	13	.278	11	–	21	.344
UT Martin	4	–	14	.222	8	–	22	.267
Eastern Illinois	3	–	15	.167	5	–	26	.161
† 2022 OVC tournament winner Rankings from AP poll

The 2021–22 SIU Edwardsville Cougars men's basketball team represented Southern Illinois University Edwardsville in the 2021–22 NCAA Division I men's basketball season. The Cougars, led by third-year head coach Brian Barone, played their home games at the First Community Arena in Edwardsville, Illinois as members of the Ohio Valley Conference (OVC). They finished the season 11–21, 4–13 in OVC play, to finish in eighth place. They lost in the first round of the OVC tournament to Tennessee State.

== Previous season ==
In a season limited due to the ongoing COVID-19 pandemic, the Cougars finished the 2020–21 season 9–17, 7–12 in OVC play, to finish in eighth place. In the first round of the OVC tournament, they were defeated by Belmont.

== Roster ==
2021–22 SIU Edwardsville Cougars men's basketball team
Players
Coaches

Pos.	#	Name	Height	Weight	Year	Previous school	Hometown
G	0	Zane Butler	5 ft 11 in (1.8 m)	165 lb (75 kg)	RS Fr	Link Year Prep	Paragould, AR
F	1	DeeJuan Pruitt	6 ft 8 in (2.03 m)	230 lb (104 kg)	RS Fr	Butler CC	Sacramento, CA
G	2	Desmond Polk	6 ft 4 in (1.93 m)	175 lb (79 kg)	RS Fr	Link Year Prep	Milwaukee, WI
G	3	Ray'Sean Taylor	6 ft 1 in (1.85 m)	175 lb (79 kg)	RS Fr	Collinsville HS	Collinsville, IL
G	4	Shamar Wright	6 ft 7 in (2.01 m)	185 lb (84 kg)	RS So	Link Year Prep	Memphis, TN
G	5	Carlos Curtis	6 ft 2 in (1.88 m)	205 lb (93 kg)	RS Jr	Triton College	Milwaukee, WI
G	11	Courtney Carter	6 ft 1 in (1.85 m)	180 lb (82 kg)	RS Jr	South Suburban College	Memphis, TN
C	12	Jonathan Kurtas	6 ft 10 in (2.08 m)	235 lb (107 kg)	Fr	Lake Norman Christian HS	Mooresville, NC
G	13	Quani Rudd	6 ft 5 in (1.96 m)	180 lb (82 kg)	Fr	Mt. Vernon HS	Mount Vernon, IL
G	21	Shaun Jr. Doss	6 ft 4 in (1.93 m)	190 lb (86 kg)	GS	Arkansas–Pine Bluff	Marion, AR
F	22	Michael Matas	6 ft 8 in (2.03 m)	200 lb (91 kg)	RS Fr	London Basketball Academy	Oakville, ON
C	23	Elochukwu Eze	6 ft 10 in (2.08 m)	240 lb (109 kg)	RS So	Asheville Christian Academy	Enugu, Nigeria
G	24	Cam Williams	6 ft 2 in (1.88 m)	190 lb (86 kg)	RS Jr	Hazelwood Central HS	St. Louis, MO
F	55	Lamar Wright	6 ft 7 in (2.01 m)	185 lb (84 kg)	RS So	Link Year Prep	Memphis, TN

Head coach

- Brian Barone (Marquette)

Assistant coach(es)

- Charles Wells (Austin Peay)
- Troy Pierce (Emporia State)
- Colin Schneider (Green Bay)

Legend

- (C) Team captain
- (S) Suspended
- (I) Ineligible
- (W) Walk-on
- Injured
- Current redshirt

Roster
Last update: December 13, 2021

== Schedule and results ==
Date time, TV	Rank^{#}	Opponent^{#}	Result	Record	High points	High rebounds	High assists	Site (attendance) city, state
Exhibition
November 4, 2021*; 7:00 p.m., ESPN+		Quincy	L 61–62	–	22 – Taylor	11 – Taylor	3 – 2 tied	First Community Arena (577); Edwardsville, IL
Non-conference regular season
November 9, 2021*; 7:30 p.m., FS2		at Marquette	L 77–88	0–1	16 – Taylor	6 – Pruitt	4 – Curtis	Fiserv Forum (13,013); Milwaukee, WI
November 12, 2021*; 7:00 p.m., ESPN+		at Chicago State	L 56–67	0–2	21 – Taylor	7 – Doss Jr.	3 – Doss Jr.	Jones Convocation Center (350); Chicago, IL
November 15, 2021*; 7:00 p.m., ESPN+		Knox	W 75–37	1–2	16 – Doss Jr.	12 – Doss Jr.	3 – 3 tied	First Community Arena (656); Edwardsville, IL
November 19, 2021*; 6:45 pm, ESPN+		vs. Niagara; The J. Arnold Wealth Management Company Tournament	L 60–70	1–3	20 – S. Wright	9 – S. Wright	4 – Carter	Covelli Centre (1,625); Youngstown, OH
November 20, 2021*; 1:00 p.m., ESPN+		at Youngstown State; The J. Arnold Wealth Management Company Tournament	W 69–66	2–3	24 – Taylor	7 – Taylor	6 – Carter	Beeghly Center (1,309); Youngstown, OH
November 21, 2021*; 12:00 p.m., ESPN+		vs. St. Thomas; The J. Arnold Wealth Management Company Tournament	L 73–86	2–4	15 – Taylor	10 – S. Wright	4 – Carter	Covelli Centre (1,439); Youngstown, OH
November 27, 2021*; 5:00 p.m., FS2		at Creighton	L 65–70	2–5	17 – Taylor	10 – Taylor	7 – Taylor	CHI Health Center Omaha (16,417); Omaha, NE
November 30, 2021*; 7:00 p.m.		at Omaha	W 75–65	3–5	20 – L. Wright	9 – Taylor	12 – Taylor	Baxter Arena (1,033); Omaha, NE
December 4, 2021*; 2:00 p.m., ESPN3		at Bradley	L 55–80	3–6	22 – Taylor	7 – Doss Jr.	1 – 5 tied	Carver Arena (3,685); Peoria, IL
December 8, 2021*; 7:00 p.m., ESPN+		Purdue Fort Wayne	W 80–59	4–6	25 – Taylor	10 – Carter	6 – Taylor	First Community Arena (863); Edwardsville, IL
December 12, 2021*; 2:00 p.m., ESPN+		Kansas City	W 60–56	5–6	14 – Taylor	11 – Pruitt	4 – Doss Jr.	First Community Arena (687); Edwardsville, IL
December 19, 2021*; 1:00 p.m., ESPN+		William Woods	W 84–29	6–6	21 – Taylor	10 – Carter	4 – 3 tied	First Community Arena (844); Edwardsville, IL
December 21, 2021*; 7:00 p.m., ESPN+		at South Alabama	L 69–84	6–7	12 – 2 tied	7 – Pruitt	3 – 3 tied	Mitchell Center (1,794); Mobile, AL
Ohio Valley regular season
January 8, 2022; 3:00 p.m., ESPN+		Murray State	L 69–74	6–8 (0–1)	24 – Taylor	6 – Taylor	5 – Taylor	First Community Arena (537); Edwardsville, IL
January 13, 2022; 8:00 p.m., ESPNU		at Eastern Illinois	W 66–53	7–8 (1–1)	17 – Doss Jr.	15 – Pruitt	5 – Carter	Lantz Arena (1,409); Charleston, IL
January 17, 2022; 6:00 p.m., ESPN+		Belmont; Rescheduled from December 30	L 64–80	7–9 (1–2)	14 – Pruitt	6 – Pruitt	6 – Taylor	First Community Arena (678); Edwardsville, IL
January 20, 2022; 6:00 p.m., ESPN+		at Tennessee Tech	L 76–94	7–10 (1–3)	18 – Doss Jr.	16 – Pruitt	5 – 2 tied	Eblen Center (1,644); Cookeville, TN
January 22, 2022; 3:00 p.m., ESPN+		at Morehead State	L 74–77	7–11 (1–4)	26 – Taylor	6 – 2 tied	4 – Taylor	Ellis Johnson Arena (1,460); Morehead, KY
January 24, 2022; 7:00 p.m., ESPN+		at UT Martin; Rescheduled from January 1	L 70–76	7–12 (1–5)	15 – 2 tied	8 – Doss Jr.	4 – Carter	Skyhawk Arena (1,113); Martin, TN
January 27, 2022; 7:30 p.m., ESPN+		Tennessee State	L 70–75	7–13 (1–6)	26 – Taylor	10 – Carter	9 – Carter	First Community Arena (1,273); Edwardsville, IL
January 29, 2022; 4:00 p.m., ESPN+		at Southeast Missouri State	L 77–85	7–14 (1–7)	25 – Taylor	8 – 2 tied	2 – 3 tied	Show Me Center (935); Cape Girardeau, MO
January 31, 2022; 6:00 p.m., ESPN+		at Austin Peay; Rescheduled from January 6	L 63–68 ^{2OT}	7–15 (1–8)	18 – Doss Jr.	8 – 2 tied	5 – S. Wright	Dunn Center (1,298); Clarksville, TN
February 5, 2022; 7:00 p.m., ESPN+		at Murray State	L 59–79	7–16 (1–9)	18 – Doss Jr.	7 – Kurtas	2 – 2 tied	CFSB Center (5,305); Murray, KY
February 7, 2022; 7:00 p.m., ESPN+		Southeast Missouri State; Rescheduled from January 15	L 47–76	7–17 (1–10)	13 – Pruitt	10 – Doss Jr.	2 – Doss Jr.	First Community Arena (565); Edwardsville, IL
February 10, 2022; 7:30 p.m., ESPN+		UT Martin	W 71–63	8–17 (2–10)	16 – Doss	7 – Pruitt	6 – Carter	First Community Arena (441); Edwardsville, IL
February 12, 2022; 3:30 p.m., ESPN+		Tennessee Tech	W 61–60	9–17 (3–10)	17 – Pruitt	12 – Pruitt	7 – Carter	First Community Arena (627); Edwardsville, IL
February 17, 2022; 7:30 p.m., ESPN+		at Tennessee State	L 65–81	9–18 (3–11)	15 – Doss Jr.	7 – Pruitt	3 – Carter	Gentry Complex (3,000); Nashville, TN
February 19, 2022; 4:00 p.m., ESPN+		at Belmont	L 62–73	9–19 (3–12)	16 – Doss Jr.	7 – 2 tied	4 – S. Wright	Curb Event Center (2,027); Nashville, TN
February 21, 2022; 7:30 p.m., ESPN+		Eastern Illinois; Rescheduled from February 3	W 66–52	10–19 (4–12)	13 – S. Wright	10 – Pruitt	3 – 3 tied	First Community Arena (692); Edwardsville, IL
February 24, 2022; 7:30 p.m., ESPN+		Austin Peay	L 64–68 ^{OT}	10–20 (4–13)	21 – Carter	6 – S. Wright	5 – Carter	First Community Arena (484); Edwardsville, IL
February 26, 2022; 3:30 p.m., ESPN+		Morehead State	W 77–70	11–20 (4–14)	21 – S. Wright	6 – 3 tied	6 – Carter	First Community Arena (674); Edwardsville, IL
Ohio Valley tournament
March 2, 2022; 6:30 p.m., ESPN+	(8)	vs. (5) Tennessee State; First round	L 62–77	11–21	16 – Doss Jr.	10 – Doss Jr.	4 – Doss Jr.	Ford Center; Evansville, IN
*Non-conference game. ^{#}Rankings from AP poll. (#) Tournament seedings in parentheses. All times are in Central.
