= 2021–22 Eastern Illinois Panthers men's basketball team =

American college basketball season

2021–22 Eastern Illinois Panthers men's basketball
- Conference: Ohio Valley Conference
- Record: 5–26 (3–15 OVC)
- Head coach: Marty Simmons (1st season)
- Associate head coach: Doug Novsek
- Assistant coaches: Justin Walker; Quinn Peterson
- Home arena: Lantz Arena

2021–22 Ohio Valley Conference men's basketball standings
	Conf.				Overall
Team	W		L	PCT	W		L	PCT
No. 20 Murray State †	18	–	0	1.000	31	–	3	.912
Belmont	15	–	3	.833	25	–	8	.758
Morehead State	13	–	5	.722	23	–	11	.676
Southeast Missouri State	8	–	9	.471	14	–	18	.438
Tennessee State	8	–	10	.444	14	–	18	.438
Austin Peay	8	–	10	.444	12	–	17	.414
Tennessee Tech	7	–	10	.412	11	–	21	.344
SIU Edwardsville	5	–	13	.278	11	–	21	.344
UT Martin	4	–	14	.222	8	–	22	.267
Eastern Illinois	3	–	15	.167	5	–	26	.161
† 2022 OVC tournament winner Rankings from AP poll

The 2021–22 Eastern Illinois Panthers men's basketball team represented Eastern Illinois University in the 2021–22 NCAA Division I men's basketball season. The Panthers, led by first-year head coach Marty Simmons, played their home games at Lantz Arena in Charleston, Illinois as members of the Ohio Valley Conference (OVC). They finished the season 5–26, 3–15 in OVC play, to finish in last place. They failed to qualify for the OVC tournament.

== Previous season ==
In a season limited due to the ongoing COVID-19 pandemic, the Panthers finished the 2020–21 season 9–18, 6–14 in OVC play, to finish in a tie for ninth place. They failed to qualify for the OVC tournament.

On March 4, 2021, the school announced that they would not renew head coach Jay Spoonhour's contract. On March 31, the school named Clemson assistant and former Evansville head coach Marty Simmons as the team's new head coach.

== Roster ==
2021–22 Eastern Illinois Panthers men's basketball team
Players
Coaches

Pos.	#	Name	Height	Weight	Year	Hometown
G	1	Kashawn Charles	6 ft 1 in (1.85 m)	185 lb (84 kg)	RS Sr	Wyandanch, NY
G	2	Myles Baker	6 ft 3 in (1.91 m)	195 lb (88 kg)	Jr	Chicago, IL
G	3	Kejuan Clements	6 ft 2 in (1.88 m)	180 lb (82 kg)	Jr	Chicago, IL
F	4	Barlow IV Alleruzzo	6 ft 9 in (2.06 m)	235 lb (107 kg)	Sr	Chicago, IL
F	5	Paul Bizimana	6 ft 8 in (2.03 m)	185 lb (84 kg)	Fr	Haltom City, TX
G	10	Elijah Wood	6 ft 5 in (1.96 m)	175 lb (79 kg)	So	Potomac, MD
G	11	CJ Lane	6 ft 5 in (1.96 m)	200 lb (91 kg)	Jr	Eatonville, FL
G	12	Micah Schnyders	6 ft 4 in (1.93 m)	185 lb (84 kg)	So	Yorkville, IL
G	13	Henry Abraham	6 ft 0 in (1.83 m)	175 lb (79 kg)	So	Cambridge, MN
G	14	Isaac Miller	6 ft 3 in (1.91 m)	180 lb (82 kg)	So	Charleston, IL
F	20	Sammy IV Friday	6 ft 9 in (2.06 m)	240 lb (109 kg)	GS	Jersey City, NJ
G	22	Chris Robinson	5 ft 11 in (1.8 m)	165 lb (75 kg)	So	Brooklyn, NY
F	23	Rodolfo Rufino Bolis	6 ft 7 in (2.01 m)	205 lb (93 kg)	Fr	Espírito Santo, Brazil
G	25	Dan Luers	6 ft 4 in (1.93 m)	190 lb (86 kg)	So	Lebanon, OH
F	34	Jermaine Hamlin	6 ft 10 in (2.08 m)	235 lb (107 kg)	Jr	Lincoln, IL

Head coach

- Marty Simmons (Evansville)

Assistant coach(es)

- Doug Novsek (Southern Illinois)
- Justin Walker (Eastern Illinois)
- Quinn Peterson (DePaul)

Legend

- (C) Team captain
- (S) Suspended
- (I) Ineligible
- (W) Walk-on
- Injured
- Current redshirt

Roster
Last update: October 30, 2021

== Schedule and results ==
Date time, TV	Rank^{#}	Opponent^{#}	Result	Record	Site (attendance) city, state
Non-conference regular season
November 9, 2021*; 7:00 p.m., BTN+		at Northwestern	L 56–80	0–1	Welsh–Ryan Arena (2,753); Evanston, IL
November 12, 2021*; 7:00 p.m., ESPN+		at Saint Louis	L 44–86	0–2	Chaifetz Arena (5,433); St. Louis, MO
November 15, 2021*; 7:00 p.m., ESPN+		Central Michigan	L 61–62	0–3	Lantz Arena (1,175); Charleston, IL
November 18, 2021*; 7:00 p.m., ESPN+		Rockford	W 96–64	1–3	Lantz Arena (705); Charleston, IL
November 22, 2021*; 6:00 p.m., ESPN+		at Eastern Kentucky; Eastern Kentucky MTE tournament	L 43–82	1–4	McBrayer Arena (2,196); Richmond, KY
November 24, 2021*; 11:00 a.m.		vs. Albany; Eastern Kentucky MTE tournament	L 62–64	1–5	McBrayer Arena (100); Richmond, KY
November 28, 2021*; 1:00 p.m., ESPN+		Evansville	L 54–70	1–6	Lantz Arena (1,011); Charleston, IL
December 1, 2021*; 7:00 p.m.		at Northern Illinois	L 45–54	1–7	Convocation Center (1,153); DeKalb, IL
December 4, 2021*; 2:00 p.m.		North Park	W 76–71	2–7	Lantz Arena (931); Charleston, IL
December 7, 2021*; 7:00 p.m., SECN+		at Missouri	L 44–72	2–8	Mizzou Arena (6,335); Columbia, MO
December 11, 2021*; 3:00 p.m., FS1		at Butler	L 54–66	2–9	Hinkle Fieldhouse (7,654); Indianapolis, IN
December 18, 2021*; 2:00 p.m.		at Western Illinois	L 54–71	2–10	Western Hall (1,004); Macomb, IL
December 21, 2021*; 6:00 p.m., ESPN3		at Ball State	L 55–75	2–11	Worthen Arena (3,279); Muncie, IN
Ohio Valley regular season
December 29, 2021; 6:00 p.m., ESPN+		at Morehead State	L 50–63	2–12 (0–1)	Ellis Johnson Arena (1,466); Morehead, KY
January 13, 2022; 8:00 p.m., ESPNU		SIU Edwardsville	L 53–66	2–13 (0–2)	Lantz Arena (1,409); Charleston, IL
January 17, 2022; 3:30 p.m., ESPNN		Murray State; Rescheduled from January 6	L 46–72	2–14 (0–3)	Lantz Arena (1,117); Charleston, IL
January 20, 2022; 7:40 p.m., ESPN+		at Murray State	L 51–91	2–15 (0–4)	CFSB Center (3,820); Murray, KY
January 22, 2022; 3:30 p.m., ESPN+		Southeast Missouri State	L 58–87	2–16 (0–5)	Lantz Arena (869); Charleston, IL
January 24, 2022; 3:30 p.m., ESPN+		Belmont; Rescheduled from January 1	L 56–90	2–17 (0–6)	Lantz Arena (823); Charleston, IL
January 27, 2022; 8:00 p.m., ESPN+		at UT Martin	W 58–53	3–17 (1–6)	Skyhawk Arena (1,124); Martin, TN
January 29, 2022; 3:30 p.m., ESPN+		Tennessee State	W 62–57	4–17 (2–6)	Lantz Arena (1,513); Charleston, IL
February 5, 2022; 4:00 p.m., ESPN+		at Southeast Missouri State	L 56–63	4–18 (2–7)	Show Me Center (924); Cape Girardeau, MO
February 7, 2022; 3:00 p.m., ESPN+		at Tennessee Tech; Rescheduled from January 8	L 58–84	4–19 (2–8)	Eblen Center (804); Cookeville, TN
February 10, 2022; 7:30 p.m., ESPN+		Tennessee Tech	L 62–73	4–20 (2–9)	Lantz Arena (726); Charleston, IL
February 12, 2022; 3:30 p.m., ESPN+		UT Martin	W 82–70	5–20 (3–9)	Lantz Arena (1,225); Charleston, IL
February 14, 2022; 4:00 p.m., ESPN+		at Austin Peay; Rescheduled from January 15	L 54–62	5–21 (3–10)	Dunn Center (747); Clarksville, TN
February 17, 2022; 7:00 p.m., ESPN+		at Belmont	L 57–81	5–22 (3–11)	Curb Event Center (1,882); Nashville, TN
February 19, 2022; 3:00 p.m., ESPN+		at Tennessee State	L 49–63	5–23 (3–12)	Gentry Complex (1,036); Nashville, TN
February 21, 2022; 7:30 p.m., ESPN+		at SIU Edwardsville; Rescheduled from February 3	L 52–66	5–24 (3–13)	First Community Arena (692); Edwardsville, IL
February 24, 2022; 7:30 p.m., ESPN+		Morehead State	L 46–82	5–25 (3–14)	Lantz Arena (832); Charleston, IL
February 26, 2022; 3:30 p.m., ESPN+		Austin Peay	L 52–64	5–26 (3–15)	Lantz Arena (1,130); Charleston, IL
*Non-conference game. ^{#}Rankings from AP poll. (#) Tournament seedings in parentheses. All times are in Central.
