= 2022 Ohio Valley Conference men's basketball tournament =

- Classification: Division I
- Season: 2021–22
- Teams: 8
- Site: Ford Center; Evansville, Indiana
- Champions: Murray State (18th title)
- Winning coach: Matt McMahon (3rd title)
- MVP: Justice Hill (Murray State)
- Television: ESPN+, ESPNU, ESPN2

2021–22 Ohio Valley Conference men's basketball standings
	Conf.				Overall
Team	W		L	PCT	W		L	PCT
No. 20 Murray State †	18	–	0	1.000	31	–	3	.912
Belmont	15	–	3	.833	25	–	8	.758
Morehead State	13	–	5	.722	23	–	11	.676
Southeast Missouri State	8	–	9	.471	14	–	18	.438
Tennessee State	8	–	10	.444	14	–	18	.438
Austin Peay	8	–	10	.444	12	–	17	.414
Tennessee Tech	7	–	10	.412	11	–	21	.344
SIU Edwardsville	5	–	13	.278	11	–	21	.344
UT Martin	4	–	14	.222	8	–	22	.267
Eastern Illinois	3	–	15	.167	5	–	26	.161
† 2022 OVC tournament winner Rankings from AP poll

The 2022 Ohio Valley Conference men's basketball tournament was the conference tournament concluding the 2021–22 season of the Ohio Valley Conference (OVC). The entire tournament, contested during March 2–5, 2022, was played at the Ford Center in Evansville, Indiana. The winner, the Murray State Racers, received the conference's automatic bid to the 2022 NCAA tournament.

== Seeds ==
Only the top eight teams in the conference qualified for the tournament. Teams were seeded by record within the conference, with a tiebreaker system to seed teams with identical conference records. The first tiebreaker was head-to-head results between the tied teams and the second tiebreaker was comparing each team's record against individual teams in the conference starting with the top-ranked team and working down until they are no longer tied.

Seed	School	Conf.	Tiebreaker
1	Murray State	18–0	
2	Belmont	15–3	
3	Morehead State	13–5	
4	Southeast Missouri State	8–9	
5	Tennessee State	8–10	1–1 v. Austin Peay; 0–2 v. Murray State; 0–2 v. Belmont; 0–2 v. Morehead State; 1–1 v. Southeast Missouri State; 2–0 v. Tennessee Tech
6	Austin Peay	8–10	1–1 v. Tennessee State; 0–2 v. Murray State; 0–2 v. Belmont; 0–2 v. Morehead State; 1–1 v. Southeast Missouri State; 1–1 v. Tennessee Tech
7	Tennessee Tech	7–10	
8	SIU Edwardsville	5–13	

== Schedule ==
Game	Time	Matchup	Score	Television
First Round – Wednesday, March 2
1	6:30 pm	No. 5 Tennessee State vs. No. 8 SIU Edwardsville	77–62	ESPN+
2	9:00 pm	No. 6 Austin Peay vs. No. 7 Tennessee Tech	75–68	ESPN+
Quarterfinals – Thursday, March 3
3	6:30 pm	No. 4 Southeast Missouri State vs. No. 5 Tennessee State	79–55	ESPN+
4	9:00 pm	No. 3 Morehead State vs. No. 7 Tennessee Tech	73–56	ESPN+
Semifinals – Friday, March 4
5	7:00 pm	No. 1 Murray State vs. No. 4 Southeast Missouri State	88–74	ESPNU
6	9:30 pm	No. 2 Belmont vs. No. 3 Morehead State	53–51	ESPNU
Championship – Saturday, March 5
7	7:30 pm	No. 1 Murray State vs. No. 3 Morehead State	71–67	ESPN2
All game times in Central Time.

== Bracket ==
First round Wednesday, March 2
5	Tennessee State	77
8	SIU Edwardsville	62
6	Austin Peay	51
7	Tennessee Tech	78

Quarterfinals; Thursday, March 3
4	Southeast Missouri State	79
5	Tennessee State	55
3	Morehead State	73
7	Tennessee Tech	56

Semifinals; Friday, March 4
1	Murray State	88
4	Southeast Missouri State	74
2	Belmont	51
3	Morehead State	53

Championship; Saturday, March 5
1	Murray State	71
3	Morehead State	67

* denotes number of overtime periods
