= 2021–22 Belmont Bruins men's basketball team =

American college basketball season

2021–22 Belmont Bruins men's basketball

NIT, first round
- Conference: Ohio Valley Conference
- Record: 25–8 (15–3 OVC)
- Head coach: Casey Alexander (3rd season)
- Associate head coach: Brian Ayers
- Assistant coaches: Sean Rutigliano; Tyler Holloway
- Home arena: Curb Event Center

2021–22 Ohio Valley Conference men's basketball standings
	Conf.				Overall
Team	W		L	PCT	W		L	PCT
No. 20 Murray State †	18	–	0	1.000	31	–	3	.912
Belmont	15	–	3	.833	25	–	8	.758
Morehead State	13	–	5	.722	23	–	11	.676
Southeast Missouri State	8	–	9	.471	14	–	18	.438
Tennessee State	8	–	10	.444	14	–	18	.438
Austin Peay	8	–	10	.444	12	–	17	.414
Tennessee Tech	7	–	10	.412	11	–	21	.344
SIU Edwardsville	5	–	13	.278	11	–	21	.344
UT Martin	4	–	14	.222	8	–	22	.267
Eastern Illinois	3	–	15	.167	5	–	26	.161
† 2022 OVC tournament winner Rankings from AP poll

The 2021–22 Belmont Bruins men's basketball team represented Belmont University in the 2021–22 NCAA Division I men's basketball season. The Bruins, led by third-year head coach Casey Alexander, played their home games at the Curb Event Center in Nashville, Tennessee as members of the Ohio Valley Conference (OVC). They finished the season 25–8, 15–3 in OVC play, to finish in second place. They lost in the semifinals of the OVC tournament to Morehead State. They received an invite to the National Invitation Tournament (NIT) where they lost to Vanderbilt in the first round.

On September 18, 2021, Belmont announced that this would be the last season for the team in the OVC as they would join the Missouri Valley Conference on July 1, 2022.

== Previous season ==
In a season limited due to the ongoing COVID-19 pandemic, the Bruins finished the 2020–21 season 26–4, 18–2 in OVC play, to win the regular-season championship. They defeated SIU–Edwardsville and Jacksonville State before losing to Morehead State in the OVC tournament championship game. Because of a limited National Invitation Tournament due to COVID-19, the Bruins did not receive an automatic bid to the NIT for being regular-season champions. They failed to receive an at-large bid to the NIT.

== Roster ==
2021–22 Belmont Bruins men's basketball team
Players
Coaches

Pos.	#	Name	Height	Weight	Year	Hometown
C	0	Even Brauns	6 ft 9 in (2.06 m)	240 lb (109 kg)	So	Iowa City, IA
G	1	Isaiah Walker	6 ft 5 in (1.96 m)	185 lb (84 kg)	Fr	Wyoming, OH
G	2	Grayson Murphy	6 ft 3 in (1.91 m)	190 lb (86 kg)	GS	Franklin, TN
G	3	Luke Smith	6 ft 0 in (1.83 m)	170 lb (77 kg)	GS	Knoxville, TN
G	4	Will Richard	6 ft 5 in (1.96 m)	195 lb (88 kg)	Fr	Fairburn, GA
G	5	EJ Bellinger	6 ft 4 in (1.93 m)	205 lb (93 kg)	Jr	St. Peters, MO
F	10	Caleb Hollander	6 ft 8 in (2.03 m)	245 lb (111 kg)	GS	Nashville, TN
F	11	Michael Shanks	6 ft 6 in (1.98 m)	215 lb (98 kg)	RS So	Bentonville, AR
G	20	Tate Pierson	6 ft 6 in (1.98 m)	210 lb (95 kg)	GS	Brentwood, TN
F	21	Derek Sabin	6 ft 9 in (2.06 m)	235 lb (107 kg)	RS Jr	Slinger, WI
G	22	Ben Sheppard	6 ft 6 in (1.98 m)	185 lb (84 kg)	Jr	Atlanta, GA
G	24	JaCobi Wood	6 ft 2 in (1.88 m)	180 lb (82 kg)	So	Cleveland, TN
F	25	Frank Jakubicek	6 ft 8 in (2.03 m)	245 lb (111 kg)	So	Cary, IL
C	33	Nick Muszynski	6 ft 11 in (2.11 m)	245 lb (111 kg)	GS	Pickerington, OH

Head coach

- Casey Alexander (Belmont)

Assistant coach(es)

- Brian Ayers (Lipscomb)
- Sean Rutigliano (Cortland State)
- Tyler Holloway (Murray State)

Legend

- (C) Team captain
- (S) Suspended
- (I) Ineligible
- (W) Walk-on
- Injured
- Current redshirt

Roster
Last update: January 10, 2025

== Schedule and results ==
Date time, TV	Rank^{#}	Opponent^{#}	Result	Record	Site (attendance) city, state
Regular season
November 9, 2021*; 7:00 p.m., ESPN+		at Ohio	L 80–92	0–1	Convocation Center (6,123); Athens, OH
November 13, 2021*; 4:00 p.m., ESPN+		Evansville	W 81–43	1–1	Curb Event Center (2,421); Nashville, TN
November 15, 2021*; 6:30 p.m., ESPN+		Furman	W 95–89 ^{OT}	2–1	Curb Event Center (1,727); Nashville, TN
November 19, 2021*; 6:00 p.m., ESPN+		at Kennesaw State	W 97–78	3–1	KSU Convocation Center (1,262); Kennesaw, GA
November 22, 2021*; 7:00 p.m., SECN+		at LSU	L 53–83	3–2	Pete Maravich Assembly Center (9,923); Baton Rouge, LA
November 25, 2021*; 7:30 p.m., ESPNU		vs. Drake; ESPN Events Invitational quarterfinal	W 74–69	4–2	HP Field House (3,008); Kissimmee, FL
November 26, 2021*; 6:30 p.m., ESPNU		vs. Iona; ESPN Events Invitational semifinal	W 72–65	5–2	HP Field House (3,020); Kissimmee, FL
November 28, 2021*; 4:00 p.m., ESPN2		vs. Dayton; ESPN Events Invitational final	L 61–63	5–3	HP Field House (3,127); Kissimmee, FL
December 2, 2021*; 7:00 p.m., ESPN+		Lipscomb	W 94–65	6–3	Curb Event Center (3,856); Nashville, TN
December 5, 2021*; 2:00 p.m., ESPN+		at Samford	W 85–73	7–3	Pete Hanna Center (0); Homewood, AL
December 7, 2021*; 7:00 p.m., NBCS		at Saint Louis	W 64–59	8–3	Chaifetz Arena (4,521); St. Louis, MO
December 15, 2021*; 5:00 p.m., ESPN+		Chattanooga	W 76–68	9–3	Curb Event Center (2,075); Nashville, TN
December 18, 2021*; 2:00 p.m., ESPN+		Bethel (IN)	W 115–86	10–3	Curb Event Center (1,406); Nashville, TN
OVC regular season
January 6, 2022; 7:00 p.m., ESPN+		Southeast Missouri State	W 102–62	11–3 (1–0)	Curb Event Center (278); Nashville, TN
January 8, 2022; 3;30 p.m., ESPN+		at UT Martin	W 81–55	12–3 (2–0)	Skyhawk Arena (1,329); Martin, TN
January 13, 2022; 7:00 p.m., ESPN+		Tennessee Tech	W 92–77	13–3 (3–0)	Curb Event Center (1,188); Nashville, TN
January 15, 2022; 4:00 p.m., ESPN+		Murray State	L 60–82	13–4 (3–1)	Curb Event Center (2,432); Nashville, TN
January 17, 2022; 6:00 p.m., ESPN+		at SIU–Edwardsville; Rescheduled from December 30	W 80–64	14–4 (4–1)	Vadalabene Center (678); Edwardsville, IL
January 20, 2022; 6:00 p.m., ESPNews		at Morehead State	L 74–83	14–5 (4–2)	Ellis Johnson Arena (2,456); Morehead, KY
January 24, 2022; 5:00 p.m., ESPN+		at Eastern Illinois; Rescheduled from January 1	W 90–56	15–5 (5–2)	Lantz Arena (823); Charleston, IL
January 27, 2022; 7:30 p.m., ESPN+		at Austin Peay	W 75–67	16–5 (6–2)	Dunn Center (1,514); Clarksville, TN
January 29, 2022; 2:00 p.m., ESPN+		UT Martin	W 87–58	17–5 (7–2)	Curb Event Center (1,601); Nashville, TN
February 3, 2022; 7:30 p.m., ESPN+		at Tennessee State	W 88–61	18–5 (8–2)	Gentry Complex (2,001); Nashville, TN
February 5, 2022; 7:30 p.m., ESPN+		at Tennessee Tech	W 100–92 ^{OT}	19–5 (9–2)	Eblen Center (2,945); Cookeville, TN
February 7, 2022; 6:30 p.m., ESPN+		Austin Peay	W 72–58	20–5 (10–2)	Curb Event Center (1,503); Nashville, TN
February 10, 2022; 7:00 p.m., ESPN+		Morehead State	W 48–47	21–5 (11–2)	Curb Event Center (1,468); Nashville, TN
February 12, 202; 4:00 p.m., ESPN+		at Southeast Missouri State	W 81–72	22–5 (12–2)	Show Me Center (1,469); Cape Girardeau, MO
February 17, 2022; 7:00 p.m., ESPN+		Eastern Illinois	W 81–57	23–5 (13–2)	Curb Event Center (1,882); Nashville, TN
February 19, 2022; 4:00 p.m., ESPN+		SIU–Edwardsville	W 73–62	24–5 (14–2)	Curb Event Center (2,027); Nashville, TN
February 24, 2022; 7:00 p.m., ESPNU		at No. 19 Murray State	L 43–76	24–6 (14–3)	CFSB Center (8,041); Murray, KY
February 26, 2022; 5:00 p.m., ESPN+		Tennessee State	W 87–67	25–6 (15–3)	Curb Event Center (3,578); Nashville, TN
Ohio Valley Conference tournament
March 4, 2022; 9:30 p.m., ESPNU	(2)	vs. (3) Morehead State; Semifinals	L 51–53	25–7	Ford Center; Evansville, IN
NIT
March 15, 2022*; 6:00 p.m., ESPN2		at (4) Vanderbilt; First round – Dayton Bracket	L 71–82	25–8	Memorial Gymnasium (7,773); Nashville, TN
*Non-conference game. ^{#}Rankings from AP poll. (#) Tournament seedings in parentheses. All times are in Central.

== Rankings ==
Ranking movements Legend: — = Not ranked RV = Received votes
	Week																				
Poll	Pre	1	2	3	4	5	6	7	8	9	10	11	12	13	14	15	16	17	18	19	Final
AP	RV		—	—	—	—	—														
Coaches	—		—*	—	—	—	—														
