= 2021–22 Tennessee State Tigers basketball team =

American college basketball season

2021–22 Tennessee State Tigers basketball
- Conference: Ohio Valley Conference
- Record: 14–18 (8–10 OVC)
- Head coach: Brian Collins (4th season)
- Assistant coaches: Ben Walker; Jerry Nichols; Russ Willemsen
- Home arena: Gentry Complex

2021–22 Ohio Valley Conference men's basketball standings
	Conf.				Overall
Team	W		L	PCT	W		L	PCT
No. 20 Murray State †	18	–	0	1.000	31	–	3	.912
Belmont	15	–	3	.833	25	–	8	.758
Morehead State	13	–	5	.722	23	–	11	.676
Southeast Missouri State	8	–	9	.471	14	–	18	.438
Tennessee State	8	–	10	.444	14	–	18	.438
Austin Peay	8	–	10	.444	12	–	17	.414
Tennessee Tech	7	–	10	.412	11	–	21	.344
SIU Edwardsville	5	–	13	.278	11	–	21	.344
UT Martin	4	–	14	.222	8	–	22	.267
Eastern Illinois	3	–	15	.167	5	–	26	.161
† 2022 OVC tournament winner Rankings from AP poll

The 2021–22 Tennessee State Tigers basketball team represented Tennessee State University in the 2021–22 NCAA Division I men's basketball season. The Tigers, led by fourth-year head coach Brian Collins, played their home games at the Gentry Complex in Nashville, Tennessee as members of the Ohio Valley Conference (OVC).

The Tigers finished the season 14–18, 8–10 in OVC play, to finish in a tie for fifth place. They defeated SIU Edwardsville in the first round of the OVC tournament before falling to Southeast Missouri State in the quarterfinals.

== Previous season ==
The Tigers finished the 2020–21 season 4–19, 3–17 in OVC play, to finish in last place. Since only the top eight teams qualify for the OVC tournament, they failed to qualify.

== Roster ==
2021–22 Tennessee State Tigers men's basketball team
Players
Coaches

Pos.	#	Name	Height	Weight	Year	Hometown
G	1	Marcus Jr. Fitzgerald	6 ft 2 in (1.88 m)	—	Fr	Nashville, TN
G	2	Carlos Jr. Marshall	6 ft 6 in (1.98 m)	—	RS Jr	Memphis, TN
G	3	Tajik Bartholomew	6 ft 3 in (1.91 m)	—	So	Austin, TX
F	4	Christian Brown	6 ft 6 in (1.98 m)	—	So	Hopkins, SC
G	5	Ethan Riggs Abner	6 ft 6 in (1.98 m)	195 lb (88 kg)	Fr	Mount Juliet, TN
G	10	Monty Johal	6 ft 3 in (1.91 m)	—	RS So	Springfield, MO
F	11	Kassim Nicholson	6 ft 7 in (2.01 m)	—	GS	Jackson, MS
F	12	Evan Joyner	6 ft 8 in (2.03 m)	—	Fr	Greensboro, NC
F	14	Shakem Johnson	6 ft 7 in (2.01 m)	210 lb (95 kg)	Sr	Youngstown, OH
G	20	Dedric Boyd	6 ft 4 in (1.93 m)	—	RS Jr	Brownsville, TN
G	21	Kenny Cooper	6 ft 1 in (1.85 m)	—	GS	Nashville, TN
F	23	Emmanuel Dowuona	6 ft 10 in (2.08 m)	—	RS So	Miami, FL
F	24	Jalen Dupree	6 ft 8 in (2.03 m)	—	GS	Cordova, TN
F	44	David Acosta	6 ft 11 in (2.11 m)	—	So	Santiago, Dominican Republic
F	55	Drew Williams	6 ft 7 in (2.01 m)	—	Fr	Chattanooga, TN

Head coach

- Brian Collins (Belmont)

Assistant coach(es)

- Ben Walker (Creighton)
- Jerry Nichols (Arkansas State)
- Russ Willemsen (Lee)

Legend

- (C) Team captain
- (S) Suspended
- (I) Ineligible
- (W) Walk-on
- Injured
- Current redshirt

Roster
Last update: January 6, 2022

== Schedule and results ==
Date time, TV	Rank^{#}	Opponent^{#}	Result	Record	Site (attendance) city, state
Exhibition
October 27, 2021*; 2:30 p.m.		Trevecca Nazarene	W 76–55	–	Gentry Complex (4,102); Nashville, TN
Non-conference regular season
November 9, 2021*; 7:00 p.m.		vs. Alabama A&M	L 73–82	0–1	Von Braun Center (2,561); Huntsville, AL
November 13, 2021*; 4:00 p.m.		vs. Norfolk State; Gateway HBCU Invitational	L 59–66	0–2	Gateway Center Arena (350); College Park, GA
November 16, 2021*; 7:00 p.m., ESPN+		Fisk	W 111–56	1–2	Gentry Complex (1,574); Nashville, TN
November 21, 2021*; 2:00 p.m.		at South Dakota	L 66–83	1–3	Sanford Coyote Sports Center (847); Vermillion, SD
November 23, 2021*; 8:00 p.m., BTN		at Nebraska	L 73–79	1–4	Pinnacle Bank Arena (15,236); Lincoln, NE
November 28, 2021*; 2:00 p.m., ESPN+		Southern	L 80–82	1–5	Gentry Complex (1,452); Nashville, TN
December 1, 2021*; 7:00 p.m.		at Georgia State	Cancelled due to COVID-19 issues at Georgia State		GSU Sports Arena; Atlanta, GA
December 4, 2021*; 4:00 p.m., ESPN+		at Chicago State	L 49–59	1–6	Jones Convocation Center (597); Chicago, IL
December 10, 2021*; 6:00 p.m., ESPN+		IUPUI	W 70–44	2–6	Gentry Complex (334); Nashville, TN
December 12, 2021*; 4:00 p.m., ESPN+		at Lipscomb	W 73–65	3–6	Allen Arena (1,983); Nashville, TN
December 16, 2021*; 7:00 p.m., ESPN+		at Charleston Southern	W 78–75	4–6	Buccaneer Field House (414); North Charleston, SC
December 18, 2021*; 1:00 p.m.		at South Carolina State	L 88–90 ^{OT}	4–7	SHM Memorial Center (152); Orangeburg, SC
December 21, 2021*; 12:00 p.m., ESPN+		Campbellsville–Harrodsburg	W 108–66	5–7	Gentry Complex (175); Nashville, TN
OVC regular season
January 6, 2022; 6:00 p.m., ESPNews		UT Martin	L 78–94	5–8 (0–1)	Gentry Complex (300); Nashville, TN
January 8, 2022; 3:00 p.m., ESPN+		Southeast Missouri State	W 95–84	6–8 (1–1)	Gentry Complex (269); Nashville, TN
January 13, 2022; 7:00 p.m., ESPN+		at Murray State	L 44–67	6–9 (1–2)	CFSB Center (3,313); Murray, KY
January 15, 2022; 1:00 p.m., ESPN+		Morehead State	L 64–71	6–10 (1–3)	Gentry Complex (231); Nashville, TN
January 17, 2022; 1:00 p.m., ESPN+		Tennessee Tech; Rescheduled from December 30	W 80–64	7–10 (2–3)	Gentry Complex (271); Nashville, TN
January 20, 2022; 7:00 p.m., ESPN+		at Southeast Missouri State	L 63–85	7–11 (2–4)	Show Me Center (640); Cape Girardeau, MO
January 22, 2022; 3:00 p.m., ESPN+		Austin Peay	W 65–61	8–11 (3–4)	Gentry Complex (297); Nashville, TN
January 24, 2022; 7:00 p.m., ESPN+		at Morehead State; Rescheduled from January 1	L 54–67	8–12 (3–5)	Ellis Johnson Arena (1,388); Morehead, KY
January 27, 2022; 7:30 p.m., ESPN+		at SIU Edwardsville	W 75–70	9–12 (4–5)	First Community Arena (1,273); Edwardsville, IL
January 29, 2022; 3:30 p.m., ESPN+		at Eastern Illinois	L 57–62	9–13 (4–6)	Lantz Arena (1,513); Charleston, IL
February 3, 2022; 7:30 p.m., ESPN+		Belmont	L 61–88	9–14 (4–7)	Gentry Complex (2,001); Nashville, TN
February 5, 2022; 3:30 p.m., ESPN+		at UT Martin	W 69–61	10–14 (5–7)	Skyhawk Arena (1,716); Martin, TN
February 10, 2022; 7:30 p.m., ESPN+		No. 23 Murray State	L 62–73	10–15 (5–8)	Gentry Complex (4,567); Nashville, TN
February 12, 2022; 4:00 p.m., ESPN+		at Austin Peay	L 52–54	10–16 (5–9)	Dunn Center (1,419); Clarksville, TN
February 17, 2022; 7:30 p.m., ESPN+		SIU Edwardsville	W 81–65	11–16 (6–9)	Gentry Complex (3,000); Nashville, TN
February 19, 2022; 3:00 p.m., ESPN+		Eastern Illinois	W 63–49	12–16 (7–9)	Gentry Complex (1,036); Nashville, TN
February 24, 2022; 7:30 p.m., ESPN+		at Tennessee Tech	W 92–56	13–16 (8–9)	Eblen Center (1,896); Cookeville, TN
February 26, 2022; 5:00 p.m., ESPN+		at Belmont	L 67–87	13–17 (8–10)	Curb Event Center (3,578); Nashville, TN
Ohio Valley tournament
March 2, 2022; 6:30 p.m., ESPN+	(5)	vs. (8) SIU Edwardsville; First Round	W 77–62	14–17	Ford Center (0); Evansville, IN
March 3, 2022; 6:30 p.m., ESPN+	(5)	vs. (4) Southeast Missouri State; Quarterfinals	L 55–79	14–18	Ford Center (0); Evansville, IN
*Non-conference game. ^{#}Rankings from AP poll. (#) Tournament seedings in parentheses. All times are in Central.
