= 2021–22 Tennessee Tech Golden Eagles men's basketball team =

American college basketball season

2021–22 Tennessee Tech Golden Eagles men's basketball
- Conference: Ohio Valley Conference
- Record: 11–21 (7–10 OVC)
- Head coach: John Pelphrey (3rd season)
- Assistant coaches: Alex Fain; Blake Gray; Andrew Steele
- Home arena: Eblen Center

2021–22 Ohio Valley Conference men's basketball standings
	Conf.				Overall
Team	W		L	PCT	W		L	PCT
No. 20 Murray State †	18	–	0	1.000	31	–	3	.912
Belmont	15	–	3	.833	25	–	8	.758
Morehead State	13	–	5	.722	23	–	11	.676
Southeast Missouri State	8	–	9	.471	14	–	18	.438
Tennessee State	8	–	10	.444	14	–	18	.438
Austin Peay	8	–	10	.444	12	–	17	.414
Tennessee Tech	7	–	10	.412	11	–	21	.344
SIU Edwardsville	5	–	13	.278	11	–	21	.344
UT Martin	4	–	14	.222	8	–	22	.267
Eastern Illinois	3	–	15	.167	5	–	26	.161
† 2022 OVC tournament winner Rankings from AP poll

The 2021–22 Tennessee Tech Golden Eagles men's basketball team represented Tennessee Technological University in the 2021–22 NCAA Division I men's basketball season. The Golden Eagles, led by third-year head coach John Pelphrey, played their home games at the Eblen Center in Cookeville, Tennessee as members of the Ohio Valley Conference (OVC).

The Golden Eagles finished the season 11–21, 7–10 in OVC play, to finish in seventh place. As the No. 7 seed, they defeated Austin Peay in the first round of the OVC tournament before falling to Morehead State in the quarterfinals.

== Previous season ==
The Golden Eagles finished the 2020–21 season 5–22, 5–15 in OVC play, to finish in eleventh place. Since only the top eight teams qualify for the OVC tournament, they failed to qualify.

== Roster ==
2021–22 Tennessee Tech Golden Eagles men's basketball team
Players
Coaches

Pos.	#	Name	Height	Weight	Year	Hometown
G	1	Diante Wood	6 ft 4 in (1.93 m)	210 lb (95 kg)	So	Anniston, AL
F	2	Daniel Ramsey	6 ft 9 in (2.06 m)	235 lb (107 kg)	So	Cordele, GA
G	3	Keishawn Davidson	6 ft 2 in (1.88 m)	175 lb (79 kg)	So	Murfreesboro, TN
G	4	Jr. Clay	6 ft 0 in (1.83 m)	170 lb (77 kg)	Jr	Chattanooga, TN
G	10	CJ Gettelfinger	6 ft 4 in (1.93 m)	185 lb (84 kg)	So	Knoxville, TN
G	11	Dane Quest	6 ft 6 in (1.98 m)	190 lb (86 kg)	So	Toronto, ON
F	12	Amadou Sylla	6 ft 8 in (2.03 m)	235 lb (107 kg)	Jr	Bamako, Mali
F	13	Kenny Jr. White	6 ft 7 in (2.01 m)	205 lb (93 kg)	Fr	Madisonville, KY
F	14	Mamoudou Diarra	6 ft 9 in (2.06 m)	225 lb (102 kg)	Jr	Bamako, Mali
F	15	Jalen Stayton	6 ft 8 in (2.03 m)	205 lb (93 kg)	Fr	Murfreesboro, TN
F	20	Isaiah Nelson-Ododa	6 ft 9 in (2.06 m)	180 lb (82 kg)	Fr	Winder, GA
G	21	Bailey Gilliam	6 ft 1 in (1.85 m)	175 lb (79 kg)	Fr	Cookeville, TN
F	23	Austin Harvell	6 ft 6 in (1.98 m)	215 lb (98 kg)	Fr	Athens, AL
G	31	Caleb Christopher	6 ft 1 in (1.85 m)	180 lb (82 kg)	So	Carson, CA
F	33	Shandon Goldman	6 ft 10 in (2.08 m)	225 lb (102 kg)	GS	Evansville, AR
G	50	John Pettway	6 ft 3 in (1.91 m)	190 lb (86 kg)	GS	Safford, AL

Head coach

- John Pelphrey (Kentucky)

Assistant coach(es)

- Alex Fain (Alabama)
- Blake Gray (Alabama)
- Andrew Steele (Alabama)

Legend

- (C) Team captain
- (S) Suspended
- (I) Ineligible
- (W) Walk-on
- Injured
- Current redshirt

Roster
Last update: January 7, 2022

== Schedule and results ==
Date time, TV	Rank^{#}	Opponent^{#}	Result	Record	Site (attendance) city, state
Exhibition
October 28, 2021*; 7:30 p.m.		Berea	W 104–63	–	Eblen Center; Cookeville, TN
Non-conference regular season
November 9, 2021*; 7:00 p.m., ESPN+		at No. 12 Memphis	L 65–89	0–1	FedExForum (12,928); Memphis, TN
November 14, 2021*; 4:00 p.m., ESPN+		Oakwood	W 109–68	1–1	Eblen Center (497); Cookeville, TN
November 16, 2021*; 6:00 p.m., ESPN+		at Chattanooga; Coke Zero Sugar Classic	L 62–69	1–2	McKenzie Arena (2,701); Chattanooga, TN
November 18, 2021*; 5:00 p.m.		vs. UNC Asheville; Coke Zero Sugar Classic	L 55–61	1–3	McKenzie Arena (412); Chattanooga, TN
November 23, 2021*; 6:00 p.m., ESPN+		Lipscomb	W 88–77	2–3	Eblen Center (692); Cookeville, TN
November 26, 2021*; 2:00 p.m., SECN+/ESPN+		at No. 15 Tennessee	L 69–80	2–4	Thompson–Boling Arena (16,909); Knoxville, TN
November 30, 2021*; 6:00 p.m., ESPN+		Chattanooga	L 65–82	2–5	Eblen Center (802); Cookeville, TN
December 4, 2021*; 1:00 p.m., ESPN+		at Evansville	L 51–59	2–6	Ford Center (3,275); Evansville, IN
December 8, 2021*; 6:00 p.m., ESPN+		at Western Carolina	L 69–74 ^{OT}	2–7	Ramsey Center (1,722); Cullowhee, NC
December 11, 2021*; 1:00 p.m., ESPN+		Troy	L 72–75	2–8	Eblen Center (679); Cookeville, TN
December 16, 2021*; 3:00 p.m., ESPN+		Kentucky Christian	Cancelled due to COVID-19 protocols at Kentucky Christian		Eblen Center; Cookeville, TN
December 16, 2021*; 3:00 p.m., ESPN+		Montreat	W 117–60	3–8	Eblen Center (439); Cookeville, TN
December 18, 2021*; 1:00 p.m., ESPN+		at Wright State	L 63–72	3–9	Nutter Center (2,827); Dayton, OH
December 21, 2021*; 6:00 p.m., ESPN+		at Cincinnati	L 67–76	3–10	Fifth Third Arena (10,028); Cincinnati, OH
OVC regular season
January 13, 2022; 7:00 p.m., ESPN+		at Southeast Missouri State	Cancelled due to COVID-19 protocols		Show Me Center; Cape Girardeau, MO
January 13, 2022; 7:00 p.m., ESPN+		at Belmont	L 77–92	3–11 (0–1)	Curb Event Center (1,188); Nashville, TN
January 15, 2022; 2:00 p.m., ESPN+		at UT Martin	W 76–70	4–11 (1–1)	Skyhawk Arena (1,515); Martin, TN
January 17, 2022; 1:00 p.m., ESPN+		at Tennessee State; Rescheduled from December 30	L 64–80	4–12 (1–2)	Gentry Complex (271); Nashville, TN
January 20, 2022; 6:00 p.m., ESPN+		SIU Edwardsville	W 94–76	5–12 (2–2)	Eblen Center (1,644); Cookeville, TN
January 24, 2022; 7:00 p.m., ESPN+		at Murray State; Rescheduled from January 1	L 53–79	5–13 (2–3)	CFSB Center (3,524); Murray, KY
January 27, 2022; 7:30 p.m., ESPN+		Murray State	L 75–80	5–14 (2–4)	Eblen Center (840); Cookeville, TN
January 29, 2022; 7:30 p.m., ESPN+		Austin Peay	L 55–58	5–15 (2–5)	Eblen Center; Cookeville, TN
January 31, 2022; 6:00 p.m., ESPN+		Morehead State; Rescheduled from January 6	L 56–70	5–16 (2–6)	Eblen Center (482); Cookeville, TN
February 3, 2022; 6:00 p.m., ESPN+		at Morehead State	L 68–75	5–17 (2–7)	Ellis Johnson Arena (1,069); Morehead, KY
February 5, 2022; 7:30 p.m., ESPN+		Belmont	L 92–100 ^{OT}	5-18 (2-8)	Eblen Center (2,945); Cookeville, TN
February 7, 2022; 6:00 p.m., ESPN+		Eastern Illinois; Rescheduled from January 8	W 84–58	6–18 (3–8)	Eblen Center (804); Cookeville, TN
February 10, 2022; 7:30 p.m., ESPN+		at Eastern Illinois	W 73–62	7–18 (4–8)	Lantz Arena (726); Charleston, IL
February 12, 2022; 3:30 p.m., ESPN+		at SIU Edwardsville	L 60–61	7–19 (4–9)	First Community Arena (627); Edwardsville, IL
February 17, 2022; 7:30 p.m., ESPN+		Southeast Missouri State	W 98–94	8–19 (5–9)	Eblen Center (1,009); Cookeville, TN
February 19, 2022; 4:00 p.m., ESPN+		at Austin Peay	W 73–69	9–19 (6–9)	Dunn Center (1,372); Clarksville, TN
February 24, 2022; 7:30 p.m., ESPN+		Tennessee State	L 56–92	9–20 (6–10)	Eblen Center (1,896); Cookeville, TN
February 26, 2022; 7:30 p.m., ESPN+		UT Martin	W 88–75	10–20 (7–10)	Eblen Center (1,710); Cookeville, TN
Ohio Valley Conference tournament
March 2, 2022; 9:00 p.m., ESPN+	(7)	vs. (6) Austin Peay; First round	W 78–51	11–20	Ford Center (351); Evansville, IN
March 3, 2022; 9:00 p.m., ESPN+	(7)	vs. (3) Morehead State; Quarterfinals	L 56–73	11–21	Ford Center (591); Evansville, IN
*Non-conference game. ^{#}Rankings from AP poll. (#) Tournament seedings in parentheses. All times are in Central.
