= 2021–22 Austin Peay Governors basketball team =

American college basketball season

2021–22 Austin Peay Governors basketball
- Conference: Ohio Valley Conference
- Record: 12–17 (8–10 OVC)
- Head coach: Nate James (1st season)
- Associate head coach: Michael Cotton
- Assistant coaches: Brett Carey; Jason Harris
- Home arena: Winfield Dunn Center

2021–22 Ohio Valley Conference men's basketball standings
	Conf.				Overall
Team	W		L	PCT	W		L	PCT
No. 20 Murray State †	18	–	0	1.000	31	–	3	.912
Belmont	15	–	3	.833	25	–	8	.758
Morehead State	13	–	5	.722	23	–	11	.676
Southeast Missouri State	8	–	9	.471	14	–	18	.438
Tennessee State	8	–	10	.444	14	–	18	.438
Austin Peay	8	–	10	.444	12	–	17	.414
Tennessee Tech	7	–	10	.412	11	–	21	.344
SIU Edwardsville	5	–	13	.278	11	–	21	.344
UT Martin	4	–	14	.222	8	–	22	.267
Eastern Illinois	3	–	15	.167	5	–	26	.161
† 2022 OVC tournament winner Rankings from AP poll

The 2021–22 Austin Peay Governors men's basketball team represented Austin Peay State University in the 2021–22 NCAA Division I men's basketball season. The Governors, led by first-year head coach Nate James, played their home games at the Winfield Dunn Center in Clarksville, Tennessee as members of the Ohio Valley Conference (OVC). They finished the season 12–17, 8–10 in OVC play, to finish in a tie for fifth place. As the No. 6 seed in the OVC tournament, they lost to Tennessee Tech in the first round.

The season marked the end of one era for Austin Peay, and was originally intended to be the end of a second. After the season, the Governors left the OVC, their home since 1962, to join the ASUN Conference. The season was intended to be the Governors' last at the Dunn Center, with the new F&M Bank Arena in downtown Clarksville originally set to open for the 2022–23 season. However, the opening of the new arena was later delayed to July 2023.

== Previous season ==
In a season limited due to the ongoing COVID-19 pandemic, the Governors finished the 2020–21 season 14–13, 10–10 in OVC play, to finish in a tie for fifth place. In the OVC tournament, they lost to Eastern Kentucky in the first round.

On March 28, 2021, it was announced that head coach Matt Figger had resigned in order to take the head coaching position at Texas–Rio Grande Valley. On April 2, the school announced that Duke assistant coach Nate James had been named the team's new head coach.

== Roster ==
2021–22 Austin Peay Governors men's basketball team
Players
Coaches

Pos.	#	Name	Height	Weight	Year	Hometown
F	0	Elton Walker	6 ft 4 in (1.93 m)	200 lb (91 kg)	Sr	Miami, FL
G	1	Carlos Paez	5 ft 10 in (1.78 m)	180 lb (82 kg)	Jr	Naguanagua, Venezuela
G	2	Noel Scott	6 ft 3 in (1.91 m)	190 lb (86 kg)	So	Los Angeles, CA
G/F	3	Caleb Stone-Carrawell	6 ft 7 in (2.01 m)	215 lb (98 kg)	RS Fr	Concord, NC
C	4	Elijah Hutchins-Everett	6 ft 11 in (2.11 m)	270 lb (122 kg)	Fr	Orange, NJ
G	5	Drew Calderon	6 ft 4 in (1.93 m)	180 lb (82 kg)	Fr	The Woodlands, TX
F	10	Jalen Ware	6 ft 8 in (2.03 m)	200 lb (91 kg)	RS Fr	Winston-Salem, NC
F	11	Corbin Merritt	6 ft 8 in (2.03 m)	240 lb (109 kg)	RS Sr	Lloyd, FL
G	14	DJ Peavy	6 ft 2 in (1.88 m)	190 lb (86 kg)	RS Jr	Cibolo, TX
G	20	Codey Bates	6 ft 2 in (1.88 m)	205 lb (93 kg)	Jr	Memphis, TN
G	22	Alec Woodard	6 ft 2 in (1.88 m)	200 lb (91 kg)	Jr	Rutledge, GA
C	23	Assane Diouf	7 ft 2 in (2.18 m)	250 lb (113 kg)	RS So	Dakar, Senegal
G/F	24	Cameron Copeland	6 ft 7 in (2.01 m)	185 lb (84 kg)	Jr	Douglasville, GA
F	33	Chandler Clements	6 ft 7 in (2.01 m)	195 lb (88 kg)	RS So	Red Boiling Springs, TN
G	55	Tariq Silver	6 ft 5 in (1.96 m)	200 lb (91 kg)	RS Sr	Clarksville, TN
G		Jacob Roberts (redshirt)	6 ft 0 in (1.83 m)	160 lb (73 kg)		Memphis, TN

Head coach

- Nate James (Duke)

Assistant coach(es)

- Michael Cotton (Boston College)
- Brett Carey (UNC Asheville)
- Jason Harris (Fordham)

Legend

- (C) Team captain
- (S) Suspended
- (I) Ineligible
- (W) Walk-on
- Injured
- Current redshirt

Roster
Last update: November 14, 2021

== Schedule and results ==
Date time, TV	Rank^{#}	Opponent^{#}	Result	Record	Site (attendance) city, state
Exhibition
November 4, 2021*; 7:30 p.m., ESPN+		Life University	W 92–63	–	Dunn Center (1,541); Clarksville, TN
Non-conference regular season
November 9, 2021*; 7:00 p.m., ESPN+		UT Southern	W 86–79	1–0	Dunn Center (1,200); Clarksville, TN
November 12, 2021*; 7:00 p.m., ESPN+		at Southern Illinois	L 55–73	1–1	Banterra Center (5,000); Carbondale, IL
November 16, 2021*; 6:00 p.m., ESPN+		at Purdue Fort Wayne	L 60–65	1–2	Allen County War Memorial Coliseum (1,157); Fort Wayne, IN
November 20, 2021*; 1:00 p.m., ESPN+		at Dayton	W 87–81	2–2	UD Arena (13,407); Dayton, OH
November 26, 2021*; 2:00 p.m., ESPN+		at Howard	W 69–67	3–2	Burr Gymnasium (551); Washington, D.C.
November 29, 2021*; 7:00 p.m., ESPN+		at TCU	L 51–68	3–3	Schollmaier Arena (4,813); Fort Worth, TX
December 5, 2021*; 2:00 p.m., ESPN+		Milligan	W 98–55	4–3	Dunn Center (1,354); Clarksville, TN
December 11, 2021*; 1:00 p.m., ESPN+		at North Florida	L 84–91	4–4	UNF Arena (1,872); Jacksonville, FL
December 14, 2021*; 2:00 p.m., ESPN+		at South Florida	L 51–60	4–5	Yuengling Center (1,870); Tampa, FL
December 18, 2021*; 1:30 p.m., ESPN+		at Vanderbilt	L 51–77	4–6	Memorial Gymnasium (6,186); Nashville, TN
December 22, 2021*; 7:00 p.m., ESPN+		Western Kentucky	Postponed to 2022–23 season		Dunn Center; Clarksville, TN
Ohio Valley regular season
December 30, 2021; 7:30 p.m., ESPN+		UT Martin	L 62–65	4–7 (0–1)	Dunn Center (1,113); Clarksville, TN
January 1, 2022; 4:00 p.m., ESPN+		at Southeast Missouri State	L 79–98	4–8 (0–2)	Show Me Center (580); Cape Girardeau, MO
January 8, 2022; 4:00 p.m., ESPN+		Morehead State	L 55–66	4–9 (0–3)	Dunn Center (1,431); Clarksville, TN
January 20, 2022; 8:00 p.m., ESPN+		at UT Martin	W 72–57	5–9 (1–3)	Skyhawk Arena (1,907); Martin, TN
January 22, 2022; 3:00 p.m., ESPN+		at Tennessee State	L 61–65	5–10 (1–4)	Gentry Complex (297); Nashville, TN
January 27, 2022; 7:30 p.m., ESPN+		Belmont	L 67–75	5–11 (1–5)	Dunn Center (1,514); Clarksville, TN
January 29, 2022; 7:30 p.m., ESPN+		at Tennessee Tech	W 58–55	6–11 (2–5)	Eblen Center; Cookeville, TN
January 31, 2022; 6:00 p.m., ESPN+		SIU Edwardsville; Rescheduled from January 6	W 68–63 ^{2OT}	7–11 (3–5)	Dunn Center (1,298); Clarksville, TN
February 3, 2022; 7:30 p.m., ESPN+		Murray State	L 53–65	7–12 (3–6)	Dunn Center (971); Clarksville, TN
February 5, 2022; 3:00 p.m., ESPN+		at Morehead State	L 52–77	7–13 (3–7)	Ellis Johnson Arena (1,915); Morehead, KY
February 7, 2022; 6:30 p.m., ESPN+		at Belmont; Rescheduled from January 13	L 58–72	7–14 (3–8)	Curb Event Center (1,503); Nashville, TN
February 10, 2022; 7:30 p.m., ESPN+		Southeast Missouri State	W 74–66	8–14 (4–8)	Dunn Center (1,253); Clarksville, TN
February 12, 2022; 4:00 p.m., ESPN+		Tennessee State	W 54–52	9–14 (5–8)	Dunn Center (1,419); Clarksville, TN
February 14, 2022; 5:00 p.m., ESPN+		Eastern Illinois; Rescheduled from January 15	W 62–54	10–14 (6–8)	Dunn Center (747); Clarksville, TN
February 17, 2022; 6:00 p.m., ESPNU		at No. 21 Murray State	L 56–91	10–15 (6–9)	CFSB Center (6,217); Murray, KY
February 19, 2022; 4:00 p.m., ESPN+		Tennessee Tech	L 69–73	10–16 (6–10)	Dunn Center (1,372); Clarksville, TN
February 24, 2022; 7:30 p.m., ESPN+		at SIU Edwardsville	W 68–64 ^{OT}	11–16 (7–10)	First Community Arena (484); Edwardsville, IL
February 26, 2022; 3:30 p.m., ESPN+		at Eastern Illinois	W 64–52	12–16 (8–10)	Lantz Arena (1,130); Charleston, IL
Ohio Valley tournament
March 2, 2022; 9:00 p.m., ESPN+	(6)	vs. (7) Tennessee Tech; First round	L 51–78	12–17	Ford Center (351); Evansville, IN
*Non-conference game. ^{#}Rankings from AP Poll. (#) Tournament seedings in parentheses. All times are in Central.
