= 2021–22 UT Martin Skyhawks men's basketball team =

American college basketball season

2021–22 UT Martin Skyhawks men's basketball
- Conference: Ohio Valley Conference
- Record: 8–22 (4–14 OVC)
- Head coach: Ryan Ridder (1st season)
- Associate head coach: Matt Sligh (1st season)
- Assistant coaches: Denver Cobb (1st season); Erik Buggs (1st season)
- Home arena: Skyhawk Arena

2021–22 Ohio Valley Conference men's basketball standings
	Conf.				Overall
Team	W		L	PCT	W		L	PCT
No. 20 Murray State †	18	–	0	1.000	31	–	3	.912
Belmont	15	–	3	.833	25	–	8	.758
Morehead State	13	–	5	.722	23	–	11	.676
Southeast Missouri State	8	–	9	.471	14	–	18	.438
Tennessee State	8	–	10	.444	14	–	18	.438
Austin Peay	8	–	10	.444	12	–	17	.414
Tennessee Tech	7	–	10	.412	11	–	21	.344
SIU Edwardsville	5	–	13	.278	11	–	21	.344
UT Martin	4	–	14	.222	8	–	22	.267
Eastern Illinois	3	–	15	.167	5	–	26	.161
† 2022 OVC tournament winner Rankings from AP poll

The 2021–22 UT Martin Skyhawks men's basketball team represented the University of Tennessee at Martin in the 2021–22 NCAA Division I men's basketball season. The Skyhawks, led by first-year head coach Ryan Ridder, played their home games at Skyhawk Arena in Martin, Tennessee as members of the Ohio Valley Conference. They finished the season 8–22, 4–14 in OVC play to finish in ninth place. They failed to qualify for the OVC Tournament.

== Previous season ==
In a season limited due to the ongoing COVID-19 pandemic, the Skyhawks finished the 2020–21 season 8–16, 11–4 in OVC play to finish in a tie for ninth place. The failed to qualify for the OVC tournament.

On March 12, 2021, interim head coach Montez Robinson announced that the team would not be retaining him as head coach. On March 30, the school announced that Bethune–Cookman head coach Ryan Ridder would be the team's next head coach.

== Roster ==
2021–22 UT Martin Skyhawks men's basketball team
Players
Coaches

Pos.	#	Name	Height	Weight	Year	Hometown
F	0	KK Curry	6 ft 6 in (1.98 m)	205 lb (93 kg)	So	Cleveland, TN
G	1	Koby Jeffries	6 ft 3 in (1.91 m)	190 lb (86 kg)	RS Fr	Olive Branch, MS
G	2	KJ Simon	6 ft 3 in (1.91 m)	200 lb (91 kg)	Jr	Orlando, FL
G	3	Mikel Henderson	6 ft 1 in (1.85 m)	165 lb (75 kg)	So	Kansas City, MO
F	4	Josh Endicott	6 ft 9 in (2.06 m)	200 lb (91 kg)	Jr	Baxter, TN
F	5	Chris Nix	6 ft 9 in (2.06 m)	215 lb (98 kg)	RS So	Bellevue, TN
G	10	Darius Simmons	5 ft 11 in (1.8 m)	180 lb (82 kg)	GS	Raleigh, NC
G	11	Grant Hurst	6 ft 2 in (1.88 m)	180 lb (82 kg)	Fr	Cleveland, TN
F	12	David Didenko	6 ft 9 in (2.06 m)	230 lb (104 kg)	Jr	Yakutsk, Russia
G	13	Dylan Pumpian	6 ft 1 in (1.85 m)	165 lb (75 kg)	Fr	Marietta, GA
G	15	Phillip Hughes	6 ft 1 in (1.85 m)	180 lb (82 kg)	Fr	Madison, MS
G/F	20	Josiah Morris	6 ft 6 in (1.98 m)	215 lb (98 kg)	Fr	Mount Washington, KY
F	21	Bernie Andre	6 ft 6 in (1.98 m)	210 lb (95 kg)	GS	North Miami Beach, FL
F	55	David Kamwanga	6 ft 8 in (2.03 m)	215 lb (98 kg)	Fr	Lancaster, PA

Head coach

- Ryan Ridder (Embry–Riddle)

Assistant coach(es)

- Matt Sligh (Northwest Missouri State)
- Denver Cobb (Embry–Riddle)
- Erik Buggs (Valparaiso)

Legend

- (C) Team captain
- (S) Suspended
- (I) Ineligible
- (W) Walk-on
- Injured
- Current redshirt

Roster
Last update: December 14, 2021

== Schedule and results ==
Date time, TV	Rank^{#}	Opponent^{#}	Result	Record	Site (attendance) city, state
Exhibition
November 4, 2021*; 7:00 pm		Bethel	W 87–58	–	Skyhawk Arena (1,204); Martin, TN
Non-conference regular season
November 9, 2021*; 6:00 pm, SECN		at No. 18 Tennessee	L 62–90	0–1	Thompson–Boling Arena (16,425); Knoxville, TN
November 13, 2021*; 2:00 pm, ESPN+		Miami–Hamilton	W 94–66	1–1	Skyhawk Arena (1,194); Martin, TN
November 19, 2021*; 5:00 pm, CUSA.tv		at Florida Atlantic; Paradise Classic	L 67–75	1–2	FAU Arena (1,064); Boca Raton, FL
November 20, 2021*; 2:00 pm, CUSA.tv		vs. Troy; Paradise Classic	L 67–80	1–3	FAU Arena (352); Boca Raton, FL
November 21, 2021*; 1:00 pm, CUSA.tv		vs. North Dakota; Paradise Classic	W 77–72	2–3	FAU Arena (292); Boca Raton, FL
November 24, 2021*; 2:00 pm, ESPN+		Carver College	W 103–43	3–3	Skyhawk Arena (618); Martin, TN
November 27, 2021*; 12:00 pm, ESPN+		at Western Kentucky	L 66–81	3–4	E. A. Diddle Arena (2,927); Bowling Green, KY
December 1, 2021*; 6:00 pm, CUSA.tv		at Middle Tennessee	L 61–73	3–5	Murphy Center (2,512); Murfreesboro, TN
December 4, 2021*; 1:00 pm		at Western Illinois	L 64–81	3–6	Western Hall; Macomb, IL
December 11, 2021*; 8:00 pm, ESPN+		Middle Tennessee	L 75–84	3–7	Skyhawk Arena (1,218); Martin, TN
December 14, 2021*; 7:00 pm, ESPN+		UNC Asheville	W 79–68	4–7	Skyhawk Arena (1,041); Martin, TN
December 18, 2021*; 7:00 pm, ESPN3		at Evansville	Canceled due to COVID-19		Ford Center; Evansville, IN
December 19, 2021*; 7:00 pm		at Drake	L 54–80	4–8	Knapp Center (2,673); Des Moines, IA
December 21, 2021*; 6:00 pm, ESPNU		at No. 13 Ohio State	Canceled due to COVID-19		Value City Arena; Columbus, OH
Ohio Valley regular season
December 30, 2021; 7:30 pm, ESPN+		at Austin Peay	W 65–62	5–8 (1–0)	Dunn Center (1,113); Clarksville, TN
January 6, 2022; 6:00 pm, ESPNews		at Tennessee State	W 94–78	6–8 (2–0)	Gentry Complex (300); Nashville, TN
January 8, 2022; 3:30 pm, ESPN+		Belmont	L 55–81	6–9 (2–1)	Skyhawk Arena (1,329); Martin, TN
January 12, 2022; 6:00 pm, ESPN+		at Morehead State	L 62–76	6–10 (2–2)	Ellis Johnson Arena (1,816); Morehead, KY
January 15, 2022; 3:30 pm, ESPN+		Tennessee Tech	L 70–76	6–11 (2–3)	Skyhawk Arena (1,515); Martin, TN
January 20, 2022; 8:00 pm, ESPN+		Austin Peay	L 57–72	6–12 (2–4)	Skyhawk Arena (1,907); Martin, TN
January 22, 2022; 7:00 pm, ESPN+		at Murray State	L 66–74	6–13 (2–5)	CFSB Center (4,722); Murray, KY
January 24, 2022; 7:00 pm, ESPN+		SIU Edwardsville; Rescheduled from January 1	W 76–70	7–13 (3–5)	Skyhawk Arena (1,113); Martin, TN
January 27, 2022; 8:00 pm, ESPN+		Eastern Illinois	L 53–58	7–14 (3–6)	Skyhawk Arena (1,124); Martin, TN
January 29, 2022; 2:00 pm, ESPN+		at Belmont	L 58–87	7–15 (3–7)	Curb Event Center (1,601); Nashville, TN
February 3, 2022; 8:00 pm, ESPN+		Southeast Missouri State	W 84–63	8–15 (4–7)	Skyhawk Arena (506); Martin, TN
February 5, 2022; 3:30 pm, ESPN+		Tennessee State	L 61–69	8–16 (4–8)	Skyhawk Arena (1,716); Martin, TN
February 10, 2022; 7:30 pm, ESPN+		at SIU Edwardsville	L 63–71	8–17 (4–9)	First Community Arena (441); Edwardsville, IL
February 12, 2022; 3:30 pm, ESPN+		at Eastern Illinois	L 70–82	8–18 (4–10)	Lantz Arena (1,225); Charleston, IL
February 16, 2022; 8:00 pm, ESPN+		Morehead State	L 60–68	8–19 (4–11)	Skyhawk Arena (1,367); Martin, TN
February 19, 2022; 3:30 pm, ESPN+		No. 21 Murray State	L 60–62	8–20 (4–12)	Skyhawk Arena (3,257); Martin, TN
February 24, 2022; 7:00 pm, ESPN+		at Southeast Missouri State	L 69–76	8–21 (4–13)	Show Me Center (742); Cape Girardeau, MO
February 26, 2022; 7:30 pm, ESPN+		at Tennessee Tech	L 75–88	8–22 (4–14)	Eblen Center (1,710); Cookeville, TN
*Non-conference game. ^{#}Rankings from AP Poll. (#) Tournament seedings in parentheses. All times are in Central.
