= 2021–22 Morehead State Eagles men's basketball team =

American college basketball season

2021–22 Morehead State Eagles men's basketball
- Conference: Ohio Valley Conference
- Record: 23–11 (13–5 OVC)
- Head coach: Preston Spradlin (5th season)
- Associate head coach: Jonathan Mattox
- Assistant coaches: Scott Combs; Dominic Lombardi
- Home arena: Ellis Johnson Arena

2021–22 Ohio Valley Conference men's basketball standings
	Conf.				Overall
Team	W		L	PCT	W		L	PCT
No. 20 Murray State †	18	–	0	1.000	31	–	3	.912
Belmont	15	–	3	.833	25	–	8	.758
Morehead State	13	–	5	.722	23	–	11	.676
Southeast Missouri State	8	–	9	.471	14	–	18	.438
Tennessee State	8	–	10	.444	14	–	18	.438
Austin Peay	8	–	10	.444	12	–	17	.414
Tennessee Tech	7	–	10	.412	11	–	21	.344
SIU Edwardsville	5	–	13	.278	11	–	21	.344
UT Martin	4	–	14	.222	8	–	22	.267
Eastern Illinois	3	–	15	.167	5	–	26	.161
† 2022 OVC tournament winner Rankings from AP poll

The 2021–22 Morehead State Eagles men's basketball team represented Morehead State University in the 2021–22 NCAA Division I men's basketball season. The Eagles, led by fifth-year head coach Preston Spradlin, played their home games at Ellis Johnson Arena in Morehead, Kentucky as members of the Ohio Valley Conference.

== Previous season ==
The Eagles finished the 2020–21 season 23–8, 17–3 in OVC play to finish in second place. In the OVC tournament, they defeated Southeast Missouri State in the first round, Eastern Kentucky in the semifinals, advancing to the championship game, where they knocked off top-seeded Belmont, earning the Eagles their first trip to the NCAA tournament since 2011. In the NCAA tournament, they received the #14 seed in the Midwest Region, where they would lose to #3 seeded West Virginia in the first round.

== Roster ==
2021–22 Morehead State Eagles men's basketball team
Players
Coaches

Pos.	#	Name	Height	Weight	Year	Previous school	Hometown
F	0	Tyzhaun Claude	6 ft 8 in (2.03 m)	240 lb (109 kg)	RS So	Moravian Prep	Goldsboro, NC
G	1	Tucson Redding	6 ft 3 in (1.91 m)	—	Jr	Northeastern Oklahoma A&M	Aurora, CO
F	2	Jaylen Sebree	6 ft 7 in (2.01 m)	200 lb (91 kg)	Jr	Florida Atlantic	Hopkinsville, KY
G	3	Drew Thelwell	6 ft 3 in (1.91 m)	185 lb (84 kg)	Fr	The Master's Academy	Orlando, FL
F	4	Johni Broome	6 ft 10 in (2.08 m)	235 lb (107 kg)	Fr	Tampa Catholic HS	Plant City, FL
G	5	Skyelar Potter	6 ft 3 in (1.91 m)	198 lb (90 kg)	Jr	Wright State	Bowling Green, KY
F	11	Jaylon Hall	6 ft 5 in (1.96 m)	190 lb (86 kg)	RS Jr	Wright State	Houston, TX
F	13	Julius Dixon	6 ft 7 in (2.01 m)	202 lb (92 kg)	So	Fayetteville HS	Fayetteville, TN
G	14	Chris Cole	6 ft 6 in (1.98 m)	—	Fr	Brookwood HS	Lawrenceville, GA
G	15	Braden May	5 ft 10 in (1.78 m)	—	Fr	Mason County HS	Maysville, KY
G	21	Tray Hollowell	6 ft 3 in (1.91 m)	—	GS	Wofford	Hopkinsville, KY
F	22	LJ Bryan	6 ft 9 in (2.06 m)	235 lb (107 kg)	Jr	State Fair CC	Cheltenham, MD
G	24	Jake Wolfe	6 ft 5 in (1.96 m)	—	RS Jr	Lipscomb	Aurora, IL
G	55	Ta'lon Cooper	6 ft 4 in (1.93 m)	190 lb (86 kg)	So	Dorman HS	Spartanburg, SC

Head coach

- Preston Spradlin (Alice Lloyd)

Assistant coach(es)

- Jonathan Mattox (Emmanuel)
- Scott Combs (Austin Peay)
- Dominic Lombardi (Indiana (PA))

Legend

- (C) Team captain
- (S) Suspended
- (I) Ineligible
- (W) Walk-on
- Injured
- Current redshirt

Roster
Last update: December 15, 2021

== Schedule and results ==
Date time, TV	Rank^{#}	Opponent^{#}	Result	Record	Site (attendance) city, state
Exhibition
November 4, 2021*; 7:00 pm		Kentucky State	W 89–43	–	Ellis Johnson Arena (1,300); Morehead, KY
Non-conference regular season
November 9, 2021*; 8:00 pm, SECN+		at No. 22 Auburn	L 54–77	0–1	Auburn Arena (9,121); Auburn, AL
November 12, 2021*; 7:00 pm		at UAB	L 71–85	0–2	Bartow Arena (2,829); Birmingham, AL
November 15, 2021*; 7:00 pm, ESPN+		Kentucky Christian	W 82–57	1–2	Ellis Johnson Arena (1,443); Morehead, KY
November 18, 2021*; 7:30 pm, ESPN+		Transylvania	W 84–59	2–2	Ellis Johnson Arena (1,284); Morehead, KY
November 21, 2021*; 3:00 pm, SECN+		at Mississippi State	L 46–66	2–3	Humphrey Coliseum (6,108); Starkville, MS
November 26, 2021*; 8:00 pm, ESPN+		at Arkansas State; Eracism Invitational	W 75–51	3–3	First National Bank Arena (1,132); Jonesboro, AR
November 27, 2021*; 7:00 pm		vs. Kansas City; Eracism Invitational	W 70–62	4–3	First National Bank Arena (181); Jonesboro, AR
December 1, 2021*; 7:00 pm, ESPN+		Georgia Southern	W 59–51	5–3	Ellis Johnson Arena (1,555); Morehead, KY
December 6, 2021*; 7:00 pm, ESPN+		Presbyterian	W 71–66	6–3	Ellis Johnson Arena (1,614); Morehead, KY
December 11, 2021*; 4:00 pm, ESPN+		at East Tennessee State	L 75–82	6–4	Freedom Hall Civic Center (2,621); Johnson City, TN
December 15, 2021*; 8:30 pm, FS1		at No. 22 Xavier	L 63–86	6–5	Cintas Center (9,252); Cincinnati, OH
December 18, 2021*; 4:00 pm, ESPN+		Alice Lloyd	W 87-47	7–5	Ellis Johnson Arena (1,305); Morehead, KY
December 21, 2021*; 7:00 pm, ESPN+		at IUPUI	W 80–52	8–5	Indiana Farmers Coliseum (728); Indianapolis, IN
Ohio Valley regular season
December 29, 2021; 7:00 pm, ESPN+		Eastern Illinois	W 63–50	9–5 (1–0)	Ellis Johnson Arena (1,466); Morehead, KY
January 8, 2022; 5:00 pm, ESPN+		at Austin Peay	W 66–55	10–5 (2–0)	Dunn Center (1,431); Clarksville, TN
January 12, 2022; 7:00 pm, ESPN+		UT Martin	W 76–62	11–5 (3–0)	Ellis Johnson Arena (1,816); Morehead, KY
January 15, 2022; 4:00 pm, ESPN+		at Tennessee State	W 71–64	12–5 (4–0)	Gentry Complex (231); Nashville, TN
January 20, 2022; 7:00 pm, ESPNews		Belmont	W 83–74	13–5 (5–0)	Ellis Johnson Arena (2,456); Morehead, KY
January 22, 2022; 4:00 pm, ESPN+		SIU Edwardsville	W 77–74	14–5 (6–0)	Ellis Johnson Arena (1,460); Morehead, KY
January 24, 2022; 7:00 pm, ESPN+		Tennessee State; Rescheduled from January 1	W 67–54	15–5 (7–0)	Ellis Johnson Arena (1,388); Morehead, KY
January 27, 2022; 9:00 pm, ESPNU		at Southeast Missouri State	W 74–73 ^{OT}	16–5 (8–0)	Show Me Center (1,325); Cape Girardeau, MO
January 29, 2022; 5:00 pm, ESPN+		at Murray State	L 66–77	16–6 (8–1)	CFSB Center (5,529); Murray, KY
January 31, 2022; 7:00 pm, ESPN+		at Tennessee Tech; Rescheduled from January 6	W 70–56	17–6 (9–1)	Eblen Center (482); Cookeville, TN
February 3, 2022; 7:00 pm, ESPN+		Tennessee Tech	W 75–68	18–6 (10–1)	Ellis Johnson Arena (1,069); Morehead, KY
February 5, 2022; 4:00 pm, ESPN+		Austin Peay	W 77–52	19–6 (11–1)	Ellis Johnson Arena (1,915); Morehead, KY
February 10, 2022; 8:00 pm, ESPN+		at Belmont	L 47–48	19–7 (11–2)	Curb Event Center (1,468); Nashville, TN
February 12, 2022; 4:00 pm, ESPN+		No. 23 Murray State	L 53–57	19–8 (11–3)	Ellis Johnson Arena (3,960); Morehead, KY
February 16, 2022; 9:00 pm, ESPN+		at UT Martin	W 68–60	20–8 (12–3)	Skyhawk Arena (1,367); Martin, TN
February 19, 2022; 4:00 pm, ESPN+		Southeast Missouri State	L 84–92	20–9 (12–4)	Ellis Johnson Arena (2,511); Morehead, KY
February 24, 2022; 8:30 pm, ESPN+		at Eastern Illinois	W 82–46	21–9 (13–4)	Lantz Arena (832); Charleston, IL
February 26, 2022; 4:30 pm, ESPN+		at SIU Edwardsville	L 70–77	21–10 (13–5)	First Community Arena (674); Edwardsville, IL
Ohio Valley tournament
March 3, 2022; 10:00 pm, ESPN+	(3)	vs. (7) Tennessee Tech; Quarterfinals	W 73–56	22–10	Ford Center (591); Evansville, IN
March 4, 2022; 10:30 pm, ESPNU	(3)	vs. (2) Belmont; Semifinals	W 53–51	23–10	Ford Center (4,160); Evansville, IN
March 5, 2022; 8:30 pm, ESPN2	(3)	vs. (1) No. 22 Murray State; Championship	L 67–71	23–11	Ford Center (6,491); Evansville, IN
*Non-conference game. ^{#}Rankings from AP Poll. (#) Tournament seedings in parentheses. All times are in Eastern.
