= 2021–22 Drake Bulldogs men's basketball team =

American college basketball season

2021–22 Drake Bulldogs men's basketball

CBI, Quarterfinals
- Conference: Missouri Valley Conference
- Record: 25–11 (13–5 MVC)
- Head coach: Darian DeVries (4th season)
- Assistant coaches: Marty Richter; Matt Gatens; Achoki Moikobu
- Home arena: Knapp Center

2021–22 Missouri Valley Conference men's basketball standings
	Conf.				Overall
Team	W		L	PCT	W		L	PCT
Northern Iowa	14	–	4	.778	20	–	12	.625
Missouri State	13	–	5	.722	23	–	11	.676
Drake	13	–	5	.722	25	–	11	.694
Loyola Chicago †	13	–	5	.722	25	–	8	.758
Bradley	11	–	7	.611	17	–	14	.548
Southern Illinois	9	–	9	.500	16	–	14	.533
Valparaiso	6	–	12	.333	14	–	18	.438
Illinois State	5	–	13	.278	13	–	20	.394
Indiana State	4	–	14	.222	11	–	20	.355
Evansville	2	–	16	.111	6	–	24	.200
† 2022 MVC tournament winner

The 2021–22 Drake Bulldogs men's basketball team represented Drake University during the 2021–22 NCAA Division I men's basketball season. The Bulldogs were led by fourth-year head coach Darian DeVries. They played their home games at the Knapp Center in Des Moines, Iowa as members of the Missouri Valley Conference (MVC). They finished the regular season 22–9, 13–5 in MVC play to finish in a tie for second place. As the No. 3 seed in the MVC tournament, they defeated Southern Illinois in the quarterfinals and Missouri State in the semifinals before losing to Loyola in the championship.

The Bulldogs accepted an invitation to the College Basketball Invitational and earned the No. 1 overall seed. They defeated Purdue Fort Wayne in the first round before being upset by UNC Wilmington in the quarterfinals.

== Previous season ==
In a season limited due to the ongoing COVID-19 pandemic, the Bulldogs finished the 2020–21 season 26–5, 15–3 in MVC play to finish in second place. The team set a school record by winning their first 18 games, representing the fourth-best start by an MVC school and equaling the sixth-longest winning streak in MVC history. They also earned a ranking in the AP Poll for the first time since 2008 at No. 25 prior to suffering their first loss of the season to Valparaiso on February 7, 2021.

In the MVC tournament, the Bulldogs advanced to the semifinals via forfeit due to COVID-19 issues at Northern Iowa. They defeated Missouri State in the semifinals before falling to Loyola in the championship game. Drake received an at-large bid to the NCAA tournament as a No. 11 seed in the West region. They defeated Wichita State in the First Four, which was Drake's first tournament win in 50 years. They then lost to USC in the first round.

Prior to the NCAA tournament, DeVries signed an eight-year contract extension through the 2028–29 season.

== Offseason ==
=== Departures ===
Name	Number	Pos.	Height	Weight	Year	Hometown	Reason for departure
Joseph Yesufu	1	G	6'0"	180	Sophomore	Bolingbrook, IL	Transferred to Kansas
Noah Thomas	14	G	6'2"	163	Senior	Sydney, Australia	Graduated
Andrew Barrett	22	G/F	6'5"	183	Junior	Rock Island, IL	Walk-on; did not return to team
Connor Gholson	25	G	6'3"	192	RS Junior	Newton, IA	In transfer portal

=== Incoming transfers ===
Name	Number	Pos.	Height	Weight	Year	Hometown	Previous School
Ayo Akinwole	14	G	5'11"	180	Senior	Papillion, NE	Transferred from Omaha

=== 2021 recruiting class ===
College recruiting information
Name	Hometown	School	Height	Weight	Commit date
Conor Enright #55 G	Mundelein, IL	Mundelein High School	6 ft 0 in (1.83 m)	170 lb (77 kg)	Nov 1, 2019
Conor Enright #55 G	Recruit ratings: No ratings found				
Tucker DeVries #12 G/F	Waukee, IA	Waukee High School	6 ft 7 in (2.01 m)	210 lb (95 kg)	Oct 12, 2020
Tucker DeVries #12 G/F	Recruit ratings: Rivals: 247Sports: ESPN: (78)				
Overall recruit ranking:
Note: In many cases, Scout, Rivals, 247Sports, On3, and ESPN may conflict in their listings of height and weight.; In these cases, the average was taken. ESPN grades are on a 100-point scale.; Sources: "2021 Team Ranking". Rivals.

== Roster ==
2021–22 Drake Bulldogs men's basketball team
Players
Coaches

Pos.	#	Name	Height	Weight	Year	Previous school	Hometown
G	0	D. J. Wilkins	6 ft 2 in (1.88 m)	188 lb (85 kg)	RS Sr	Florida Southwestern State; Merrillville	Merrillville, IN
G	1	Roman Penn	6 ft 0 in (1.83 m)	185 lb (84 kg)	RS Sr	Siena; Bishop Noll	Calumet City, IL
F	2	Tremell Murphy	6 ft 6 in (1.98 m)	210 lb (95 kg)	RS Sr	Florida Southwestern State; Griffith	Griffith, IN
G	3	Garrett Sturtz (W)	6 ft 3 in (1.91 m)	180 lb (82 kg)	Sr	Newton	Newton, IA
F	4	ShanQuan Hemphill	6 ft 6 in (1.98 m)	200 lb (91 kg)	Sr	Green Bay; Michigan City	Gary, IN
G	10	Okay Djamgouz	6 ft 5 in (1.96 m)	190 lb (86 kg)	RS So	London Basketball Academy	Toronto, Canada
G/F	11	Bryceson Burns	6 ft 5 in (1.96 m)	195 lb (88 kg)	So	Westfield	Houston, TX
G/F	12	Tucker DeVries	6 ft 7 in (2.01 m)	210 lb (95 kg)	Fr	Waukee	Waukee, IA
F	13	Issa Samake (injured)	6 ft 8 in (2.03 m)	225 lb (102 kg)	RS So	Grand View Christian	Des Moines, IA
G	14	Ayo Akinwole	5 ft 11 in (1.8 m)	180 lb (82 kg)	Sr	Omaha; Papillion-La Vista Senior	Papillion, NE
G	20	Jonah Jackson	6 ft 3 in (1.91 m)	205 lb (93 kg)	Sr	John A. Logan College; Merrillville	Merrillville, IN
F	21	Jordan Kwiecinski	6 ft 9 in (2.06 m)	205 lb (93 kg)	So	Loyola Academy	Chicago, IL
F	24	Nate Ferguson	6 ft 8 in (2.03 m)	220 lb (100 kg)	RS So	Lemont	Lemont, IL
G	41	Deven Dahlke (W)	6 ft 2 in (1.88 m)	188 lb (85 kg)	So	St. Mary's	Phoenix, AZ
F	51	Darnell Brodie	6 ft 10 in (2.08 m)	275 lb (125 kg)	Sr	Seton Hall; Newark East Side	Newark, NJ
G	55	Conor Enright	6 ft 0 in (1.83 m)	170 lb (77 kg)	Fr	Mundelein	Mundelein, IL

Head coach

- Darian DeVries (Northern Iowa)

Assistant coach(es)

- Marty Richter (Simpson)
- Matt Gatens (Iowa)
- Achoki Moikobu (Fort Hays State)

Legend

- (C) Team captain
- (S) Suspended
- (I) Ineligible
- (W) Walk-on
- Injured
- Current redshirt

Roster

== Schedule and results ==
Date time, TV	Rank^{#}	Opponent^{#}	Result	Record	High points	High rebounds	High assists	Site (attendance) city, state
Exhibition
November 4, 2021*; 7:00 pm		Drury	W 96–49		16 – Djamgouz	9 – Hemphill	4 – Tied	Knapp Center (2,257); Des Moines, IA
Regular season
November 9, 2021*; 7:00 pm, ESPN3		Coe	W 87–61	1–0	14 – Tied	8 – Murphy	5 – Wilkins	Knapp Center (2,591); Des Moines, IA
November 14, 2021*; 2:00 pm, MC22/ESPN+		South Dakota	W 99–50	2–0	14 – Hemphill	8 – Tied	4 – Tied	Knapp Center (2,827); Des Moines, IA
November 20, 2021*; 12:00 pm, MC22/ESPN+		Richmond	W 73–70	3–0	18 – Murphy	9 – Sturtz	4 – Penn	Knapp Center (3,347); Des Moines, IA
November 25, 2021*; 6:00 p.m., ESPNU		vs. Belmont; ESPN Events Invitational First Round	L 69–74	3–1	18 – Murphy	11 – Sturtz	5 – Penn	HP Field House (3,008); Kissimmee, FL
November 26, 2021*; 3:30 p.m., ESPNU		vs. No. 10 Alabama; ESPN Events Invitational Consolation round	L 71–80	3–2	17 – Wilkins	7 – Murphy	6 – Penn	HP Field House (3,020); Kissimmee, FL
November 28, 2021*; 9:30 a.m., ESPNU		vs. North Texas; ESPN Events Invitational 7th Place Game	L 54–57	3–3	13 – Murphy	6 – Sturtz	1 – Penn	HP Field House (3,252); Kissimmee, FL
December 2, 2021; 8:00 pm, ESPNU		Valparaiso	W 73–66	4–3 (1–0)	14 – Brodie	7 – Hemphill	5 – Penn	Knapp Center (2,560); Des Moines, IA
December 5, 2021*; 2:00 pm, ESPN3		St. Thomas	W 74–64	5–3	21 – DeVries	8 – DeVries	2 – Tied	Knapp Center (2,674); Des Moines, IA
December 8, 2021*; 8:00 pm		at Omaha	W 78–70	6–3	24 – DeVries	6 – Sturtz	4 – Wilkins	Baxter Arena; Omaha, NE
December 11, 2021*; 2:00 pm, ACCN		vs. Clemson; Holiday Hoopsgiving	L 80–90 ^{OT}	6–4	19 – DeVries	8 – Hemphill	4 – Wilkins	State Farm Arena (8,557); Atlanta, GA
December 16, 2021*; 7:00 pm, MC22/ESPN+		Jackson State	W 70–65 ^{OT}	7–4	17 – Hemphill	12 – Hemphill	5 – Wilkins	Knapp Center (2,660); Des Moines, IA
December 19, 2021*; 2:00 pm, MC22/ESPN3		UT Martin	W 80–54	8–4	15 – Tied	9 – Sturtz	7 – DeVries	Knapp Center (2,673); Des Moines, IA
~~December 22, 2021~~*; ~~2:00 pm~~		vs. ~~Saint Louis~~; ~~Las Vegas Showcase~~	Canceled due to COVID-19					~~South Point Arena~~; ~~Enterprise, NV~~
December 22, 2021*; 5:00 pm		Chicago State; Rescheduled from December 19, originally canceled	W 87–50	9–4	14 – Tied	8 – DeVries	4 – Akinwole	Knapp Center (1,943); Des Moines, IA
December 28, 2021*; 7:00 pm, ESPN+		Mount Marty	W 82–53	10–4	16 – Wilkins	7 – Murphy	3 – Tied	Knapp Center (3,146); Des Moines, IA
January 2, 2022; 7:00 pm, MVC TV		at Missouri State	L 56–61	10–5 (1–1)	16 – Sturtz	11 – Sturtz	3 – Brodie	JQH Arena (3,242); Springfield, MO
January 8, 2022; 4:00 pm, ESPN+		at Evansville	W 60–59	11–5 (2–1)	15 – DeVries	9 – Sturtz	5 – Penn	Ford Center (3,134); Evansville, IN
January 12, 2022; 7:00 pm, MVC TV		Illinois State	W 86–75	12–5 (3–1)	16 – Tied	6 – Brodie	6 – Penn	Knapp Center (2,702); Des Moines, IA
January 17, 2022; 7:00 pm, ESPN+		at Southern Illinois; Rescheduled from January 5	W 60–59	13–5 (4–1)	16 – Sturtz	8 – Sturtz	4 – DeVries	Banterra Center (4,112); Carbondale, IL
January 19, 2022; 7:00 pm, MC22/ESPN+		Bradley	L 71–83	13–6 (4–2)	17 – DeVries	8 – Sturtz	3 – Penn	Knapp Center (2,724); Des Moines, IA
January 22, 2022; 5:00 pm, ESPNU		at Northern Iowa	W 82–74 ^{OT}	14–6 (5–2)	18 – Penn	11 – DeVries	4 – Sturtz	McLeod Center (4,361); Cedar Falls, IA
January 26, 2022; 7:00 pm, ESPN+		at Illinois State	W 89–88 ^{OT}	15–6 (6–2)	18 – Tied	11 – Sturtz	6 – DeVries	Redbird Arena (3,515); Normal, IL
January 30, 2022; 1:00 pm, ESPN2		Loyola–Chicago	W 77–68	16–6 (7–2)	20 – Wilkins	10 – Brodie	3 – DeVries	Knapp Center (3,994); Des Moines, IA
February 2, 2022; 6:00 pm, ESPN+		at Indiana State	W 85–67	17–6 (8–2)	15 – Tied	9 – Sturtz	6 – Penn	Hulman Center (2,811); Terre Haute, IN
February 5, 2022; 5:00 pm, ESPNU		Northern Iowa	L 69–74 ^{OT}	17–7 (8–3)	15 – DeVries	11 – Sturtz	3 – Penn	Knapp Center (5,984); Des Moines, IA
February 9, 2022; 7:00 pm, MVC TV		Missouri State	L 62–66	17–8 (8–4)	12 – Tied	8 – Sturtz	6 – Penn	Knapp Center (3,305); Des Moines, IA
February 12, 2022; 7:00 pm, ESPN+		at Bradley	L 59–68	17–9 (8–5)	20 – DeVries	8 – Murphy	3 – Murphy	Carver Arena (5,109); Peoria, IL
February 16, 2022; 7:00 pm, ESPN+		Evansville	W 73–51	18–9 (9–5)	16 – DeVries	7 – Hemphill	6 – Penn	Knapp Center (3,569); Des Moines, IA
February 19, 2022; 5:00 pm, ESPN2		at Loyola–Chicago	W 83–76	19–9 (10–5)	24 – DeVries	7 – Sturtz	4 – Sturtz	Joseph J. Gentile Arena (4,557); Chicago, IL
February 21, 2022; 7:00 pm, ESPN+		Indiana State	W 74–58	20–9 (11–5)	15 – Tied	7 – Murphy	5 – Penn	Knapp Center (3,352); Des Moines, IA
February 23, 2022; 6:00 pm, ESPN+		at Valparaiso	W 71–65	21–9 (12–5)	17 – Wilkins	9 – Murphy	9 – Penn	Athletics–Recreation Center (2,530); Valparaiso, IN
February 26, 2022; 3:00 pm, CBSSN		Southern Illinois	W 62–60	22–9 (13–5)	14 – Murphy	10 – Sturtz	3 – Tied	Knapp Center (4,417); Des Moines, IA
MVC tournament
March 4, 2022; 8:30 pm, MVC TV	(3)	vs. (6) Southern Illinois; Quarterfinals	W 65–52	23–9	19 – Hemphill	10 – Hemphill	3 – Penn	Enterprise Center (5,503); St. Louis, MO
March 5, 2022; 5:00 pm, CBSSN	(3)	vs. (2) Missouri State; Semifinals	W 79–78 ^{OT}	24–9	23 – DeVries	8 – Sturtz	6 – Penn	Enterprise Center (6,371); St. Louis, MO
March 6, 2022; 1:00 pm, CBS	(3)	vs. (4) Loyola–Chicago; Championship	L 58–64	24–10	18 – Penn	10 – Hemphill	4 – Penn	Enterprise Center (5,164); St. Louis, MO
CBI
March 19, 2022; 11:00 am, FloHoops	(1)	vs. (16) Purdue Fort Wayne; First Round	W 87–65	25–10	20 – Djamgouz	7 – Brodie	6 – DeVries	Ocean Center (367); Daytona Beach, FL
March 21, 2022; 12:00 pm, FloHoops	(1)	vs. (9) UNC Wilmington; Quarterfinals	L 75–76	25–11	15 – Hemphill	7 – Hemphill	3 – Penn	Ocean Center (706); Daytona Beach, FL
*Non-conference game. ^{#}Rankings from AP Poll. (#) Tournament seedings in parentheses. All times are in Central Time.

== Rankings ==
Ranking movements Legend: ██ Increase in ranking ██ Decrease in ranking — = Not ranked RV = Received votes
	Week																	
Poll	Pre	1	2	3	4	5	6	7	8	9	10	11	12	13	14	15	16	Final
AP	RV	RV	RV	—	—	—	—	—	—	—	—	—	—	—	—	—	—	Not released
Coaches	RV	RV^	RV	—	—	—	—	—	—	—	—	—	—	—	—	—	—	—

^Coaches did not release a Week 1 poll.
