= ESPN Events Invitational =

College basketball tournament

Terry's Chocolate ESPN Events Invitational
- Sport: College basketball (men's)
- Founded: 2006
- No. of teams: 8 (2006–2023); 4 (2024); 16 (2025)
- Most recent champions: Adventure: UC San Diego; Imagination: Illinois State; Magic: BYU
- Most titles: Gonzaga (3)

The Terry's Chocolate ESPN Events Invitational (previously the ESPN Events Invitational, Orlando Invitational, AdvoCare Invitational, Orlando Classic, and Old Spice Classic) is an annual college basketball tournament originally played over the Thanksgiving weekend—Thursday, Friday, and Sunday. The inaugural tournament was held November 23, 24, and 26, 2006. The Metro Atlantic Athletic Conference serves as the host for the event. The tournament is played in the State Farm Field House within the ESPN Wide World of Sports Complex that is part of the Walt Disney World Resort in Kissimmee, Florida.

From 2006 through 2023, the tournament consisted of eight teams from separate conferences. All eight teams were guaranteed three games. Teams who lost in the first round moved to the consolation bracket and could finish no better than fifth place, whereas teams who won in the first round moved to the championship bracket and could finish no worse than fourth place. The final ranking of the teams was determined by separate games for first, third, fifth, and seventh places. The 2020 tournament was cancelled because of the COVID-19 pandemic.

In 2024, the tournament had only four teams, with winners in the first (semifinal) round advancing to the championship game. The two teams that lost in the semifinals played in the third-place game.

In 2025, the tournament will last five days, include sixteen teams, and consist of twenty games played across three separate brackets. The tournament will open with the eight-team Adventure Bracket played over its first three days. During the final two days, eight other teams will play in two separate four-team brackets, the Imagination Bracket and the Magic Bracket.

== Standings history ==
Year	Bracket	First place	Second place	Third place	Fourth place	Fifth place	Sixth place	Seventh place	Eighth place
2006		Arkansas	West Virginia	Marist	Western Michigan	Southern Illinois	Virginia Tech	Montana	Minnesota
2007		NC State	Villanova	George Mason	Kansas State	South Carolina	Rider	UCF	Penn State
2008		Gonzaga	Tennessee	Georgetown	Maryland	Michigan State	Wichita State	Oklahoma State	Siena
2009		Florida State	Marquette	Alabama	Michigan	Baylor	Xavier	Iona	Creighton
2010		Notre Dame	Wisconsin	Boston College	California	Texas A&M	Temple	Georgia	Manhattan
2011		Dayton	Minnesota	Indiana State	Fairfield	DePaul	Arizona State	Wake Forest	Texas Tech
2012		Gonzaga	Davidson	Oklahoma	West Virginia	Clemson	Marist	Vanderbilt	UTEP
2013		Memphis	Oklahoma State	LSU	Butler	Saint Joseph's	Washington State	Purdue	Siena
2014		Kansas	Michigan State	Marquette	Tennessee	Georgia Tech	Rhode Island	Santa Clara	Rider
2015		Xavier	Dayton	Monmouth	USC	Alabama	Notre Dame	Iowa	Wichita State
2016		Gonzaga	Iowa State	Florida	Miami	Stanford	Seton Hall	Quinnipiac	Indiana State
2017		West Virginia	Missouri	St. John's	UCF	Nebraska	Long Beach State	Oregon State	Marist
2018		Villanova	Florida State	Oklahoma State	LSU	College of Charleston	Memphis	UAB	Canisius
2019		Maryland	Marquette	USC	Harvard	Temple	Davidson	Fairfield	Texas A&M
2020		Invitational not held due to COVID-19 pandemic.							
2021		Dayton	Belmont	Kansas	Iona	Alabama	Miami (FL)	North Texas	Drake
2022		Oklahoma	Ole Miss	Siena	Seton Hall	Memphis	Stanford	Nebraska	Florida State
2023		Florida Atlantic	Virginia Tech	Texas A&M	Iowa State	Butler	Boise State	VCU	Penn State
2024		Florida	Wichita State	Wake Forest	Minnesota	N/A			
2025	Adventure	UC San Diego	Towson	Bradley	Liberty	Rhode Island	Temple	Vermont	Princeton
2025	Imagination	Illinois State	Furman	Richmond	Charlotte	N/A			
2025	Magic	BYU	Dayton	Miami	Georgetown	N/A			

== Brackets ==
* – Denotes overtime period

=== 2025 ===
The 2025 Terry's Chocolate ESPN Events Invitational field consisted of sixteen team distributed across three brackets:

- The eight-team Adventure bracket was played November 24–26 and consisted of Bradley, UC San Diego, Liberty, Princeton, Rhode Island, Temple, Towson, and Vermont.
- The four-team Imagination Bracket was played November 27–28 and consisted of Furman, Illinois State, Charlotte, and Richmond.
- The four-team Magic Bracket was also played November 27–28 and consisted of BYU, Dayton, Georgetown, and Miami.

==== Adventure bracket ====
Fifth Place; November 26; ESPNU
Rhode Island	90
Temple	75
Seventh Place; November 26; ESPN+
Vermont	79
Princeton	74

Consolation Semifinals; November 25; ESPNU
Rhode Island	80
Vermont	65
Temple	79
Princeton	75

Quarterfinals; November 24; ESPN2/ESPNU
Rhode Island	55
Towson	62
Liberty	79
Vermont	73
Temple	76
UC San Diego	91
Princeton	64
Bradley	88

Semifinals; November 25; ESPN2
Towson	72
Liberty	69
UC San Diego	87
Bradley	77

Final; November 26; ESPN2
Towson	73
UC San Diego	87
Third Place; November 26; ESPNU
Liberty	64
Bradley	74

==== Imagination bracket ====
Consolation Final; November 28; ESPN+
Richmond	71
Charlotte	66

Semifinals; November 27; ESPN2
Richmond	72
Furman	73
Charlotte	69
Illinois State	79

Final; November 28; ESPN2
Furman	65
Illinois State	72

==== Magic bracket ====
Consolation Final; November 28; ESPN
Miami	78
Georgetown	65

Semifinals; November 27; ESPN/ESPN2
9	BYU	72
Miami	62
Georgetown	79 ^{OT}
Dayton	84

Final; November 28; ESPN
9	BYU	83
Dayton	79

=== 2024 ===
- November 28 – November 29

Consolation Final; November 29; ESPN2
Minnesota	51
Wake Forest	57

Semifinals; November 28; ESPN/ESPN2
Minnesota	66 ^{OT}
Wichita State	68
18	Florida	75
Wake Forest	58

Final; November 29; ESPN
Wichita State	51
18	Florida	88

=== 2023 ===
- November 23 – November 26

Fifth Place Game; Sunday, November 26
Butler	70
Boise State	56
Seventh Place Game
Penn State	74
VCU	86

Consolation Semifinals; Friday, November 24
Penn State	78
Butler	88
VCU	61
Boise State	65

First Round; Thursday, November 23
Penn State	77
12	Texas A&M	89
19	Florida Atlantic	91
Butler	86
Iowa State	68
VCU	64
Boise State	75
Virginia Tech	82

Semifinals; Friday, November 24
12	Texas A&M	89
19	Florida Atlantic	96
Iowa State	62
Virginia Tech	71

Championship; Sunday, November 26
19	Florida Atlantic	84
Virginia Tech	50
Third Place Game
12	Texas A&M	73
Iowa State	69

=== 2022 ===
- November 24 – November 27

Fifth Place Game; Sunday, November 27
Stanford	48
Memphis	56
Seventh Place Game
Florida State	58
Nebraska	75

Consolation Semifinals; Friday, November 25
Florida State	60
Stanford	70
Nebraska	61
Memphis	73

First Round; Thursday, November 24
Florida State	63
Siena	80
Ole Miss	72
Stanford	68
Oklahoma	69
Nebraska	56
Memphis	69
Seton Hall	70

Semifinals; Friday, November 25
Siena	62
Ole Miss	74
Oklahoma	77
Seton Hall	64

Championship; Sunday, November 27
Ole Miss	55
Oklahoma	59
Third Place Game
Siena	60
Seton Hall	55

=== 2021 ===
- November 25 – November 28

Fifth Place Game; Sunday, November 28
Miami (FL)	64
10	Alabama	96
Seventh Place Game
North Texas	57
Drake	54

Consolation Semifinals; Friday, November 26
Miami (FL)	69
North Texas	63
10	Alabama	80
Drake	71

First Round; Thursday, November 25
Dayton	76
Miami (FL)	60
North Texas	59
4	Kansas	71
10	Alabama	68
Iona	72
Belmont	74
Drake	69

Semifinals; Friday, November 26
Dayton	74
4	Kansas	73
Iona	65
Belmont	72

Championship; Sunday, November 28
Dayton	63
Belmont	61
Third Place Game
4	Kansas	96
Iona	83

=== 2020 ===
Tournament was scheduled to be played Thursday, November 26 through Sunday, November 29 but was cancelled due to the COVID-19 pandemic; the field consisted of Auburn, Belmont, Boise State, Gonzaga, Michigan State, Saint Louis, Siena and Xavier.

=== 2019 ===
- November 28–December 1

Fifth Place Game; Sunday, December 1
Temple	66
Davidson	53
Seventh Place Game
Texas A&M	62
Fairfield	67

Consolation Semifinals; Friday, November 29
Temple	65
Texas A&M	42
Fairfield	56
Davidson	67

First Round; Thursday, November 28
5	Maryland	76
Temple	69
Texas A&M	51
Harvard	62
USC	54
Fairfield	47
Davidson	63
Marquette	73

Semifinals; Friday, November 29
5	Maryland	80
Harvard	73
USC	79
Marquette	101

Championship; Sunday, December 1
5	Maryland	84
Marquette	63
Third Place Game
Harvard	62
USC	77

=== 2018 ===
- November 22 – November 25

Fifth Place Game; Sunday, November 25
Memphis	75
College of Charleston	78
Seventh Place Game
Canisius	62
UAB	68

Consolation Semifinals; Friday, November 23
Canisius	63
Memphis	71
College of Charleston	74
UAB	51

First Round; Thursday, November 22
Villanova	83
Canisius	56
Oklahoma State	84
Memphis	64
College of Charleston	55
19	LSU	67
UAB	63
14	Florida State	81

Semifinals; Friday, November 23
Villanova	77
Oklahoma State	58
19	LSU	76 ^{OT}
14	Florida State	79

Championship; Sunday, November 25
Villanova	66
14	Florida State	60
Third Place Game
Oklahoma State	90
19	LSU	77

=== 2017 ===
- November 23 – November 26

Fifth Place Game; Sunday, November 26
Long Beach State	80
Nebraska	85
Seventh Place Game
Oregon State	65
Marist	46

Consolation Semifinals; Friday, November 24
Long Beach State	74
Oregon State	69
Nebraska	84
Marist	59

First Round; Thursday, November 23
Missouri	95
Long Beach State	58
St. John's	82
Oregon State	77
UCF	68
Nebraska	59
23	West Virginia	84
Marist	78

Semifinals; Friday, November 24
Missouri	90
St. John's	82
UCF	45
23	West Virginia	83

Championship; Sunday, November 26
Missouri	79
23	West Virginia	83
Third Place Game
St. John's	46
UCF	43

=== 2016 ===
- November 24 – November 27

Fifth Place Game; Sunday, November 27
Stanford	66
Seton Hall	52
Seventh Place Game
Indiana State	77
Quinnipiac	80

Consolation Semifinals; Friday, November 25
Indiana State	62
Stanford	65
Quinnipiac	79
Seton Hall	90

First Round; Thursday, November 24
Indiana State	71
21	Iowa State	73
Stanford	53
Miami (FL)	67
11	Gonzaga	82
Quinnipiac	62
Seton Hall	76
Florida	81

Semifinals; Friday, November 25
21	Iowa State	73
Miami (FL)	56
11	Gonzaga	77
Florida	72

Championship; Sunday, November 27
21	Iowa State	71
11	Gonzaga	73
Third Place Game
Miami (FL)	56
Florida	65

=== 2015 ===
- November 26 – November 29

Fifth Place Game; Sunday, November 29
Alabama	74
17	Notre Dame	73
Seventh Place Game
20	Wichita State	65
Iowa	84

Consolation Semifinals; Friday, November 27
Alabama	64
20	Wichita State	60
17	Notre Dame	68
Iowa	62

First Round; Thursday, November 26
Alabama	45
23	Xavier	64
20	Wichita State	69
USC	72
17	Notre Dame	68
Monmouth	70
Iowa	77
Dayton	82

Semifinals; Friday, November 27
23	Xavier	87
USC	77
Monmouth	70
Dayton	73

Championship; Sunday, November 29
23	Xavier	90
Dayton	61
Third Place Game
USC	73
Monmouth	83

=== 2014 ===
- November 27 – November 30

Fifth Place Game; Sunday, November 30
Rhode Island	61
Georgia Tech	64
Seventh Place Game
Santa Clara	68
Rider	60

Consolation Semifinals; Friday, November 28
Santa Clara	44
Rhode Island	66
Rider	54
Georgia Tech	61

First Round; Thursday, November 27
Santa Clara	57
Tennessee	64
11	Kansas	76
Rhode Island	60
20	Michigan State	77
Rider	45
Marquette	72
Georgia Tech	70

Semifinals; Friday, November 28
Tennessee	67
11	Kansas	82
20	Michigan State	79
Marquette	68

Championship; Sunday, November 30
11	Kansas	61
20	Michigan State	56
Third Place Game
Tennessee	59
Marquette	67

=== 2013 ===
- November 28–December 1

Fifth Place Game; Sunday, December 1
Washington State	67
Saint Joseph's	72
Seventh Place Game
Purdue	68
Siena	63

Consolation Semifinals; Friday, November 29
Purdue	54
Washington State	69
Siena	66
Saint Joseph's	78

First Round; Thursday, November 28
Purdue	87
5	Oklahoma State	97
Butler	76
Washington State	69
21	Memphis	87
Siena	60
LSU	82
Saint Joseph's	65

Semifinals; Friday, November 29
5	Oklahoma State	69
Butler	67
21	Memphis	76
LSU	69

Championship; Sunday, December 1
5	Oklahoma State	68
21	Memphis	73
Third Place Game
Butler	68 ^{OT}
LSU	70

=== 2012 ===
- November 24–27

Fifth Place Game; Sunday, November 25
Marist	44
Clemson	59
Seventh Place Game
Vanderbilt	73
UTEP	49

Consolation Semifinals; Friday, November 23
Marist	50
Vanderbilt	33
UTEP	48
Clemson	69

First Round; Thursday, November 22
West Virginia	87
Marist	44
Vanderbilt	62
Davidson	75
UTEP	61
Oklahoma	68
Clemson	49
17	Gonzaga	57

Semifinals; Friday, November 23
West Virginia	60
Davidson	63*
Oklahoma	47
17	Gonzaga	72

Championship; Sunday, November 25
Davidson	67
17	Gonzaga	81
Third Place Game
West Virginia	70
Oklahoma	77

=== 2011 ===
- November 24–27

Fifth Place Game; Sunday, November 27
DePaul	68
Arizona State	64
Seventh Place Game
Texas Tech	61
Wake Forest	70

Consolation Semifinals; Friday, November 25
Texas Tech	70
DePaul	76
Wake Forest	56
Arizona State	84

First Round; Thursday, November 24
Texas Tech	49
Indiana State	60
Minnesota	86
DePaul	85
Dayton	80
Wake Forest	76
Arizona State	44
Fairfield	55

Semifinals; Friday, November 25
Indiana State	69
Minnesota	76
Dayton	56
Fairfield	49

Championship; Sunday, November 27
Minnesota	70
Dayton	86
Third Place Game
Indiana State	72
Fairfield	66

=== 2010 ===
- November 25–28

Fifth Place Game; Sunday, November 28
Texas A&M	54
20	Temple	51
Seventh Place Game
Georgia	61
Manhattan	58

Consolation Semifinals; Friday, November 26
Texas A&M	74
Manhattan	45
Georgia	58
20	Temple	65

First Round; Thursday, November 25
Boston College	67
Texas A&M	65
Wisconsin	50
Manhattan	35
Georgia	83 ^{2OT}
Notre Dame	89
20	Temple	50
California	57

Semifinals; Friday, November 26
Boston College	55
Wisconsin	65
Notre Dame	57
California	44

Championship; Sunday, November 28
Wisconsin	51
17	Notre Dame	58
Third Place Game
Boston College	68
California	46

=== 2009 ===
- November 26–27, 29

Fifth Place Game; Sunday, November 29
Xavier	64
Baylor	69
Seventh Place Game
Creighton	55
Iona	63

Consolation Semifinals; Friday, November 27
Creighton	67
Xavier	80
Baylor	72
20	Iona	62 ^{OT}

First Round; Thursday, November 26
Creighton	76 ^{OT}
15	Michigan	83
Marquette	71
Xavier	61
Alabama	79
Baylor	76
Florida State	54
Iona	49

Semifinals; Friday, November 27
15	Michigan	65
Marquette	79
Alabama	51
Florida State	60

Championship; Sunday, November 29
Marquette	56
Florida State	57
Third Place Game
15	Michigan	66
Alabama	68

=== 2008 ===
- November 27–28, 30

Fifth Place Game; Sunday, November 30
Wichita State	57
5	Michigan State	65
Seventh Place Game
Siena	77
Oklahoma State	68

Consolation Semifinals; Friday, November 28
Siena	70
Wichita State	72
5	Michigan State	94
Oklahoma State	79

First Round; Thursday, November 27
12	Tennessee	78
Siena	64
Wichita State	50
21	Georgetown	58
Maryland	80
5	Michigan State	62
Oklahoma State	71
9	Gonzaga	83

Semifinals; Friday, November 28
12	Tennessee	90
21	Georgetown	78
Maryland	59
9	Gonzaga	81

Championship; Sunday, November 30
12	Tennessee	74
9	Gonzaga	83
Third Place Game
21	Georgetown	75
Maryland	48

=== 2007 ===
- November 22–23, 25

Fifth Place Game; Sunday, November 25
Rider	69
20	Kansas State	82
Seventh Place Game
Penn State	59
UCF	70

Consolation Semifinals; Friday, November 23
Penn State	73
Rider	82
UCF	71
20	Kansas State	73

First Round; Thursday, November 22
South Carolina	74
Penn State	67
NC State	72
Rider	63
19	Villanova	76
UCF	68
George Mason	87
20	Kansas State	77

Semifinals; Friday, November 23
South Carolina	61
NC State	63
19	Villanova	84
George Mason	78

Championship; Sunday, November 25
NC State	69
19	Villanova	68
Third Place Game
South Carolina	68
George Mason	69

=== 2006 ===
- November 23–24, 26

Fifth Place Game; Sunday, November 26
Southern Illinois	59
20	Virginia Tech	64
Seventh Place Game
Minnesota	65
Montana	72

Consolation Semifinals; Friday, November 24
Southern Illinois	69
Minnesota	53
Virginia Tech	77
Montana	56

First Round; Thursday, November 23
Arkansas	61
Southern Illinois	53
Marist	63
Minnesota	56
Western Michigan	71
Virginia Tech	68
West Virginia	73
Montana	56

Semifinals; Friday, November 24
Arkansas	73
Marist	56
Western Michigan	54
West Virginia	79

Championship; Sunday, November 26
Arkansas	71
West Virginia	64
Third Place Game
Marist	89
Western Michigan	78

== Future fields ==
=== 2026 ===
- Boston College
- Cincinnati
- Georgia
- UCF
