= 2025–26 Little Rock Trojans men's basketball team =

American college basketball season

2025–26 Little Rock Trojans men's basketball
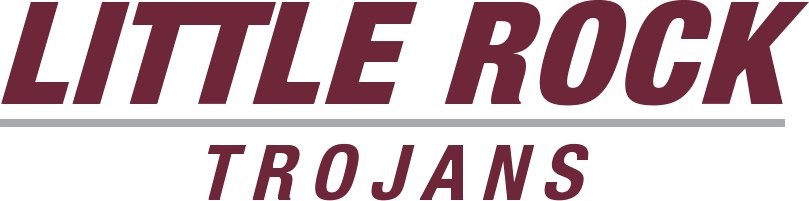
- Conference: Ohio Valley Conference
- Record: 12–20 (9–11 OVC)
- Head coach: Darrell Walker (8th season)
- Assistant coaches: Charles Baker; Charles Thomas; Evan Eustachy; Tyler Milchman
- Home arena: Jack Stephens Center

2025–26 Ohio Valley Conference men's basketball standings
	Conf.				Overall
Team	W		L	PCT	W		L	PCT
Tennessee State †	15	–	5	.750	23	–	9	.719
Morehead State	15	–	5	.750	20	–	13	.606
Southeast Missouri State	14	–	6	.700	20	–	13	.606
UT Martin	13	–	7	.650	22	–	11	.667
SIU Edwardsville	12	–	8	.600	19	–	13	.594
Lindenwood	11	–	9	.550	18	–	15	.545
Little Rock	9	–	11	.450	12	–	20	.375
Eastern Illinois	8	–	12	.400	13	–	20	.394
Tennessee Tech	8	–	12	.400	13	–	18	.419
Southern Indiana	4	–	16	.200	7	–	23	.233
Western Illinois	1	–	19	.050	5	–	26	.161
† 2026 OVC tournament winner As of March 7, 2026

The 2025–26 Little Rock Trojans men's basketball team represented the University of Arkansas at Little Rock during the 2025–26 NCAA Division I men's basketball season. The Trojans were led by Darrell Walker in his eighth and final season with the team. The Trojans played their home games at the Jack Stephens Center in Little Rock, Arkansas as fourth-year members of the Ohio Valley Conference. They finished the season 12–20, 9–11 in OVC play to finish in seventh place. They lost in the first round of the OVC tournament to Lindenwood.

On March 6, 2026, the school announced they had fired head coach Darrell Walker.

== Previous season ==
The Trojans finished the 2024–25 season 19–14, 12–8 in OVC play, to finish in a tie for third place. They defeated UT Martin, before falling to top-seeded Southeast Missouri State in the semifinals of the OVC tournament.

== Preseason ==
On October 14, 2025, the OVC released their preseason polls. Little Rock was picked atop the conference, while receiving twelve first-place votes.

=== Preseason rankings ===
ASUN Preseason Coaches Poll
Place	Team	Votes
1	Little Rock	188 (12)
2	Southeast Missouri State	177 (6)
3	SIU Edwardsville	163 (1)
4	Tennessee State	135 (1)
T-5	Lindenwood	100
T-5	Morehead State	100
7	Tennessee Tech	80
8	UT Martin	79
9	Southern Indiana	67 (2)
10	Eastern Illinois	63
11	Western Illinois	57
(#) first-place votes

=== Players to Watch ===
Each OVC team selected two "Players to Watch" for their team.

Players to Watch
Player	Position	Year
Kachi Nzeh	Forward	Junior
Braxton Bayless	Guard	Graduate Student

== Roster ==
2025–26 Little Rock Trojans men's basketball team
Players
Coaches

Pos.	#	Name	Height	Weight	Year	Previous school	Hometown
G	0	Braxton Bayless	6 ft 2 in (1.88 m)	175 lb (79 kg)	GS	Western Kentucky	Ankeny, Iowa
G	1	Joseph Thomas	6 ft 3 in (1.91 m)	165 lb (75 kg)	RS Fr	Portal High School	Portal, Georgia
G	2	KK Robinson	6 ft 0 in (1.83 m)	180 lb (82 kg)	GS	Texas A&M	Little Rock, Arkansas
G	3	Khasen Robinson	6 ft 1 in (1.85 m)	186 lb (84 kg)	RS So	Pratt Community College	Little Rock, Arkansas
G	4	Kellen Robinson	6 ft 3 in (1.91 m)	185 lb (84 kg)	Fr	Bryant High School	Little Rock, Arkansas
G	5	Christian Hughes	6 ft 2 in (1.88 m)	180 lb (82 kg)	RS So	Kirkwood High School	Kirkwood, Missouri
G	8	Travonne Jackson	6 ft 8 in (2.03 m)	195 lb (88 kg)	RS So	Garden City Community College	Columbus, Ohio
F	10	Caleb Pennyfeather	6 ft 9 in (2.06 m)	196 lb (89 kg)	So	Oviedo High School	Orlando, Florida
G	11	Johnathan Lawson	6 ft 7 in (2.01 m)	190 lb (86 kg)	RS Sr	Creighton	Memphis, Tennessee
G	12	Tracy Steele Jr.	6 ft 3 in (1.91 m)	175 lb (79 kg)	GS	Xavier (LA)	North Little Rock, Arkansas
F	15	Kachi Nzeh	6 ft 8 in (2.03 m)	225 lb (102 kg)	Jr	Penn State	Upper Darby, Pennsylvania
F	22	Truman Claytor IV	6 ft 6 in (1.98 m)	215 lb (98 kg)	Jr	Gulf Coast State College	Toledo, Ohio
F	23	Terrion Burgess	6 ft 9 in (2.06 m)	200 lb (91 kg)	Fr	Benton High School	Benton, Arkansas
F	24	Cameron Wallace	6 ft 8 in (2.03 m)	210 lb (95 kg)	Jr	Holmes Community College	Little Rock, Arkansas
F	32	Tuongthach Gatkek	6 ft 9 in (2.06 m)	187 lb (85 kg)	GS	Texas State	Portland, Maine

Head coach

- Darrell Walker (Arkansas)

Assistant coach(es)

- Charles Baker (Eastern Kentucky)
- Charles Thomas (Eastern Michigan)
- Evan Eustachy (Colorado State)
- Tyler Milchman (West Virginia)

Legend

- (C) Team captain
- (S) Suspended
- (I) Ineligible
- (W) Walk-on
- Injured
- Current redshirt

Roster

== Schedule and results ==
Date time, TV	Rank^{#}	Opponent^{#}	Result	Record	High points	High rebounds	High assists	Site (attendance) city, state
Exhibition
October 17, 2025*; 8:00 pm		Arkansas–Pine Bluff; Central Arkansas Tipoff Classic	L 69–77	–	–	–	–	Jack Stephens Center; Little Rock, AR
October 28, 2025*; 7:00 pm		Arkansas Tech	W 72–67	–	18 – Gatkek	9 – Gatkek	4 – Gatkek	Jack Stephens Center; Little Rock, AR
Non-conference regular season
November 4, 2025*; 7:00 pm, ESPN+		Arkansas Baptist	W 92–63	1–0	17 – Tied	8 – Lawson	8 – Bayless	Jack Stephens Center (1,220); Little Rock, AR
November 10, 2025*; 7:00 pm, ESPN+		at Milwaukee	L 72–92	1–1	19 – Bayless	5 – Wallace	3 – Bayless	UWM Panther Arena (1,412); Milwaukee, WI
November 12, 2025*; 7:00 pm, ESPN+		at Marquette	L 49–89	1–2	16 – Burgess	7 – Gatkek	3 – Nzeh	Fiserv Forum (13,358); Milwaukee, WI
November 15, 2025*; 6:00 pm, ESPN+		at Ball State	W 68−62	2−2	20 – Wallace	6 – Tied	6 – Lawson	Worthen Arena (3,015); Muncie, IN
November 18, 2025*; 7:00 pm, ESPN+		at Murray State	L 68−89	2−3	17 – Lawson	6 – Tied	5 – Lawson	CFSB Center (5,079); Murray, KY
November 21, 2025*; 7:00 pm, ESPN+		at Texas State	L 56–65	2–4	14 – Wallace	6 – Nzeh	3 – Steele Jr.	Strahan Arena (1,180); San Marcos, TX
November 29, 2025*; 6:00 pm, ESPN+		at Southern Illinois	L 65–74	2–5	17 – Nzeh	5 – Gatkek	10 – Lawson	Banterra Center (3,309); Carbondale, IL
December 3, 2025*; 6:30 pm, ESPN+		at Central Arkansas; Governor's I-40 Showdown	L 47–85	2–6	19 – Wallace	9 – Wallace	3 – Bayless	Farris Center (1,470); Conway, AR
December 6, 2025*; 8:00 pm, ESPN+		Arkansas State	L 78–90	2–7	33 – Lawson	5 – Tied	8 – Bayless	Jack Stephens Center (2,691); Little Rock, AR
December 9, 2025*; 6:00 pm, ESPN+		at West Virginia	L 58–90	2–8	23 – Wallace	9 – Wallace	4 – Wallace	Hope Coliseum (9,803); Morgantown, WV
OVC regular season
December 16, 2025; 6:30 pm, ESPN+		at Morehead State	L 64–78	2–9 (0–1)	17 – Gatkek	7 – Wallace	5 – Lawson	Ellis Johnson Arena (1,042); Morehead, KY
December 18, 2025; 7:30 pm, ESPN+		at Southern Indiana	W 77–62	3–9 (1–1)	21 – Nzeh	13 – Wallace	2 – Gatkek	Liberty Arena (928); Evansville, IN
December 22, 2025*; 7:00 pm, ESPN+		Williams Baptist	W 98–81	4–9	29 – Lawson	10 – Tied	6 – Tied	Jack Stephens Center (1,335); Little Rock, AR
January 1, 2026; 5:00 pm, ESPN+		Tennessee Tech	W 77–58	5–9 (2–1)	20 – Lawson	9 – Gatkek	7 – Tied	Jack Stephens Center (1,127); Little Rock, AR
January 3, 2026; 3:00 pm, ESPN+		Tennessee State	L 79–84	5–10 (2–2)	20 – Lawson	8 – Nzeh	4 – Lawson	Jack Stephens Center (1,129); Little Rock, AR
January 8, 2026; 7:30 pm, ESPN+		at SIU Edwardsville	W 73–70	6–10 (3–2)	23 – Lawson	12 – Wallace	5 – Lawson	First Community Arena (1,102); Edwardsville, IL
January 10, 2026; 3:30 pm, ESPN+		at Lindenwood	W 82–74	7–10 (4–2)	21 – Bayless	10 – Wallace	7 – Bayless	Robert F. Hyland Arena (1,016); St. Charles, MO
January 15, 2026; 7:00 pm, ESPN+		Eastern Illinois	W 74–63	8–10 (5–2)	17 – Nzeh	10 – Wallace	6 – Lawson	Jack Stephens Center (1,263); Little Rock, AR
January 17, 2026; 3:00 pm, ESPN+		Western Illinois	W 86–79	9–10 (6–2)	21 – Wallace	8 – Tied	6 – Bayless	Jack Stephens Center (1,454); Little Rock, AR
January 22, 2026; 7:30 pm, ESPN+		at Southeast Missouri State	L 65–70	9–11 (6–3)	21 – Lawson	7 – Wallace	5 – Gatkek	Show Me Center (1,463); Cape Girardeau, MO
January 29, 2026; 7:30 pm, ESPN+		at Tennessee State	L 63–70	9–12 (6–4)	16 – Lawson	10 – Gatkek	3 – Tied	Gentry Center (642); Nashville, TN
January 31, 2026; 3:00 pm, ESPN+		at Tennessee Tech	L 77–87	9–13 (6–5)	24 – Bayless	5 – Bayless	4 – Tied	Hooper Eblen Center (1,101); Cookeville, TN
February 3, 2026; 7:30 pm, ESPN+		at UT Martin	L 52–55	9–14 (6–6)	13 – Bayless	9 – Wallace	3 – Tied	Skyhawk Arena (1,208); Martin, TN
February 5, 2026; 7:00 pm, ESPN+		Lindenwood	L 74–79	9–15 (6–7)	22 – Lawson	8 – Gatkek	5 – Lawson	Jack Stephens Center (1,513); Little Rock, AR
February 7, 2026; 3:00 pm, ESPN+		SIU Edwardsville	L 61–71	9–16 (6–8)	18 – Lawson	8 – Tied	3 – Bayless	Jack Stephens Center (1,966); Little Rock, AR
February 12, 2026; 7:30 pm, ESPN+		at Western Illinois	W 77–58	10–16 (7–8)	16 – Tied	14 – Lawson	10 – Lawson	Western Hall (561); Macomb, IL
February 14, 2026; 3:30 pm, ESPN+		at Eastern Illinois	L 72–78	10–17 (7–9)	17 – Claytor IV	7 – Tied	6 – Bayless	Groniger Arena (1,214); Charleston, IL
February 19, 2026; 7:00 pm, ESPN+		UT Martin	W 67–65	11–17 (8–9)	21 – Wallace	10 – Wallace	4 – Nzeh	Jack Stephens Center (1,032); Little Rock, AR
February 21, 2026; 3:00 pm, ESPN+		Southeast Missouri State	L 65–70	11–18 (8–10)	16 – Nzeh	8 – Bayless	5 – Lawson	Jack Stephens Center (3,270); Little Rock, AR
February 26, 2026; 7:00 pm, ESPN+		Morehead State	L 70–76	11–19 (8–11)	15 – Lawson	8 – Wallace	3 – Nzeh	Jack Stephens Center (1,978); Little Rock, AR
February 28, 2026; 3:00 pm, ESPN+		Southern Indiana	W 89–70	12–19 (9–11)	19 – Tied	11 – Gatkek	7 – Bayless	Jack Stephens Center; Little Rock, AR
OVC tournament
March 4, 2026; 8:30 pm, ESPN+	(7)	vs. (6) Lindenwood; First round	L 62–72	12–20	17 – Lawson	11 – Nzeh	5 – Lawson	Ford Center (929); Evansville, IN
*Non-conference game. ^{#}Rankings from AP Poll. (#) Tournament seedings in parentheses. All times are in Central.
