= 2025–26 Western Illinois Leathernecks men's basketball team =

American college basketball season

2025–26 Western Illinois Leathernecks men's basketball
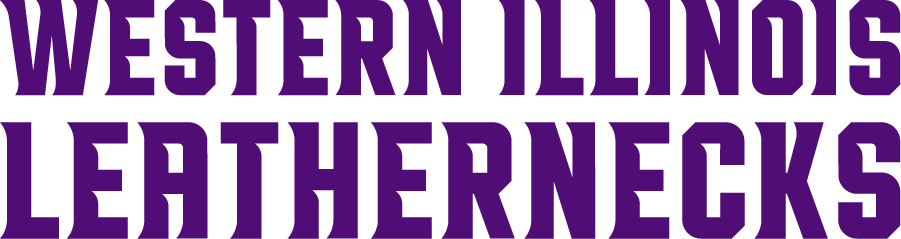
- Conference: Ohio Valley Conference
- Record: 5–26 (1–19 OVC)
- Head coach: Chad Boudreau (3rd season)
- Assistant coaches: Bryan Martin; Kris Glover; Chuck Ruffing; Solon Ellis
- Home arena: Western Hall

2025–26 Ohio Valley Conference men's basketball standings
	Conf.				Overall
Team	W		L	PCT	W		L	PCT
Tennessee State †	15	–	5	.750	23	–	9	.719
Morehead State	15	–	5	.750	20	–	13	.606
Southeast Missouri State	14	–	6	.700	20	–	13	.606
UT Martin	13	–	7	.650	22	–	11	.667
SIU Edwardsville	12	–	8	.600	19	–	13	.594
Lindenwood	11	–	9	.550	18	–	15	.545
Little Rock	9	–	11	.450	12	–	20	.375
Eastern Illinois	8	–	12	.400	13	–	20	.394
Tennessee Tech	8	–	12	.400	13	–	18	.419
Southern Indiana	4	–	16	.200	7	–	23	.233
Western Illinois	1	–	19	.050	5	–	26	.161
† 2026 OVC tournament winner As of March 7, 2026

The 2025–26 Western Illinois Leathernecks men's basketball team represented Western Illinois University during the 2025–26 NCAA Division I men's basketball season. The Leathernecks, led by third-year head coach Chad Boudreau, played their home games at Western Hall in Macomb, Illinois, as second-year members of the Ohio Valley Conference (OVC). The Leathernecks finished the season 5–26, 1–19 in OVC play to finish in last place. They failed to qualify for the OVC tournament.

== Previous season ==
The Leathernecks finished the 2024–25 season 12–19, 6–14 in OVC play, to finish in tenth place. They failed to qualify for the OVC tournament, as only the top eight teams make it.

== Preseason ==
On October 14, 2025, the OVC released their preseason polls. Western Illinois was picked to finish in last place in the conference.

=== Preseason rankings ===
OVC Preseason Coaches Poll
Place	Team	Votes
1	Little Rock	188 (12)
2	Southeast Missouri State	177 (6)
3	SIU Edwardsville	163 (1)
4	Tennessee State	135 (1)
T–5	Lindenwood	100
T–5	Morehead State	100
7	Tennessee Tech	80
8	UT Martin	79
9	Southern Indiana	67 (2)
10	Eastern Illinois	63
11	Western Illinois	57
(#) first-place votes

=== Players to Watch ===
Each OVC team selected two "Players to Watch" for their team.

Players to Watch
Player	Position	Year
Lucas Lorenzen	Guard	Junior
Antwaun Massey	Forward	Senior

== Roster ==
2025–26 Western Illinois Leathernecks men's basketball team
Players
Coaches

Pos.	#	Name	Height	Weight	Year	Previous school	Hometown
G	0	Tyran Cook	6 ft 2 in (1.88 m)	200 lb (91 kg)	So	Indiana State	Milwaukee, WI
F	1	Jack Riley	6 ft 7 in (2.01 m)	215 lb (98 kg)	Jr	Northern Oklahoma-Tonkowa	Delafield, WI
G	2	Marcus Pigram	6 ft 4 in (1.93 m)	205 lb (93 kg)	Jr	Gulf Coast State College	Chicago, IL
G	3	Lucas Lorenzen	6 ft 4 in (1.93 m)	215 lb (98 kg)	Jr	Dordt	Milford, IA
F	5	Karyiek Dixon	6 ft 5 in (1.96 m)	225 lb (102 kg)	Sr	Emporia State	London, England
G	10	Jake Edwards	6 ft 5 in (1.96 m)	175 lb (79 kg)	Fr	Winfield Mount Union High School	Winfield, IA
F	11	Ifiok Peter	6 ft 6 in (1.98 m)	225 lb (102 kg)	RS So	Cal State Monterey Bay	Las Vegas, NV
F	12	Isaiah Griffin	6 ft 6 in (1.98 m)	210 lb (95 kg)	GS	Idaho State	Raleigh, NC
G	13	Makai Kvamme	6 ft 2 in (1.88 m)	170 lb (77 kg)	Fr	DePaul College Prep	Chicago, IL
G	14	Steven Tipton	6 ft 2 in (1.88 m)	183 lb (83 kg)	Sr	Northern Illinois	Brookfield, WI
F	15	Francis Okwuosah	6 ft 6 in (1.98 m)	220 lb (100 kg)	GS	William Woods	Powder Springs, GA
F	22	Goanar Biliew	6 ft 8 in (2.03 m)	235 lb (107 kg)	GS	Bradley	Denison, IA
G/F	23	Danny Stephens	6 ft 5 in (1.96 m)	220 lb (100 kg)	RS Fr	Missouri	Bowen, IL
F	45	Antwaun Massey	6 ft 8 in (2.03 m)	200 lb (91 kg)	Sr	Southern Illinois	Olathe, KS
F	50	Nick Hittle	6 ft 10 in (2.08 m)	245 lb (111 kg)	GS	Southern Indiana	Indianapolis, IN

Head coach

- Chad Boudreau (Hannibal–LaGrange)

Assistant coach(es)

- Bryan Martin (Simpson)
- Kris Glover (Missouri)
- Chuck Ruffing (Concordia–Chicago)
- Solon Ellis (UW–Stout)

Legend

- (C) Team captain
- (S) Suspended
- (I) Ineligible
- (W) Walk-on
- Injured
- Current redshirt

Roster
Last update: December 11, 2025

== Schedule and results ==
Date time, TV	Rank^{#}	Opponent^{#}	Result	Record	Site (attendance) city, state
Non-conference regular season
November 3, 2025*; 6:00 p.m., ESPN+		at Radford	L 75–80	0–1	Dedmon Center (1,767); Radford, VA
November 7, 2025*; 6:00 p.m., B1G+		at Iowa	L 58–77	0–2	Carver–Hawkeye Arena (10,978); Iowa City, IA
November 11, 2025*; 8:30 p.m., ESPN+		at Cal State Bakersfield	L 58–74	0–3	Icardo Center (394); Bakersfield, CA
November 14, 2025*; 9:30 p.m., ESPN+		at California Baptist	L 59–69	0–4	Fowler Events Center (5,088); Riverside, CA
November 17, 2025*; 7:30 p.m., ESPN+		Coe	W 74–63	1–4	Western Hall (250); Macomb, IL
November 21, 2025*; 6:00 p.m., ESPN+		Coastal Carolina	L 64–84	1–5	Western Hall (655); Macomb, IL
November 23, 2025*; 6:00 p.m., ESPN+		North Dakota	L 69–78	1–6	Western Hall (722); Macomb, IL
November 30, 2025*; 3:00 p.m., ESPN+		St. Ambrose	W 89–73	2–6	Western Hall (368); Macomb, IL
December 2, 2025*; 6:30 p.m., ESPN+		at Drake	L 57–108	2–7	Knapp Center (2,760); Des Moines, IA
December 6, 2025*; 1:00 p.m., ESPN+		Hannibal–LaGrange	W 78–47	3–7	Western Hall (428); Macomb, IL
December 13, 2025*; 1:00 p.m., SLN		at North Dakota	W 69–66 ^{OT}	4–7	Betty Engelstad Sioux Center (1,528); Grand Forks, ND
OVC regular season
December 18, 2025; 7:30 p.m., ESPN+		at Lindenwood	L 76–92	4–8 (0–1)	Robert F. Hyland Arena (1,034); St. Charles, MO
December 22, 2025; 3:30 p.m., ESPN+		SIU Edwardsville	L 61–66	4–9 (0–2)	Western Hall (628); Macomb, IL
January 1, 2026; 3:30 p.m., ESPN+		at UT Martin	L 60–67	4–10 (0–3)	Skyhawk Arena (1,144); Martin, TN
January 3, 2026; 3:30 p.m., ESPN+		at Southeast Missouri State	L 50–73	4–11 (0–4)	Show Me Center (1,846); Cape Girardeau, MO
January 8, 2026; 7:30 p.m., ESPN+		Tennessee State	L 68–90	4–12 (0–5)	Western Hall (718); Macomb, IL
January 10, 2026; 3:30 p.m., ESPN+		Tennessee Tech	L 54–59	4–13 (0–6)	Western Hall (735); Macomb, IL
January 13, 2026; 7:30 p.m., ESPN+		at Eastern Illinois	L 55–57	4–14 (0–7)	Groniger Arena (1,324); Charleston, IL
January 17, 2026; 3:00 p.m., ESPN+		at Little Rock	L 79–86	4–15 (0–8)	Jack Stephens Center (1,454); Little Rock, AR
January 22, 2026; 6:30 p.m., ESPN+		at Morehead State	L 66–71	4–16 (0–9)	Ellis Johnson Arena (1,234); Morehead, KY
January 23, 2026; 7:30 p.m., ESPN+		at Southern Indiana	L 64–96	4–17 (0–10)	Liberty Arena (942); Evansville, IN
January 29, 2026; 7:30 p.m., ESPN+		Southeast Missouri State	L 74–78	4–18 (0–11)	Western Hall (527); Macomb, IL
January 31, 2026; 3:30 p.m., ESPN+		UT Martin	L 44–84	4–19 (0–12)	Western Hall (568); Macomb, IL
February 5, 2026; 7:30 p.m., ESPN+		at Tennessee Tech	L 72–97	4–20 (0–13)	Hooper Eblen Center (1,038); Cookeville, TN
February 7, 2026; 3:30 p.m., ESPN+		at Tennessee State	L 56–83	4–21 (0–14)	Gentry Center (327); Nashville, TN
February 10, 2026; 7:30 p.m., ESPN+		Eastern Illinois	W 79–70	5–21 (1–14)	Western Hall (273); Macomb, IL
February 12, 2026; 7:30 p.m., ESPN+		Little Rock	L 58–77	5–22 (1–15)	Western Hall (561); Macomb, IL
February 19, 2026; 7:30 p.m., ESPN+		Southern Indiana	L 70–77	5–23 (1–16)	Western Hall (505); Macomb, IL
February 21, 2026; 3:30 p.m., ESPN+		Morehead State	L 59–81	5–24 (1–17)	Western Hall (624); Macomb, IL
February 26, 2026; 7:30 p.m., ESPN+		at SIU Edwardsville	L 47–67	5–25 (1–18)	First Community Arena (1,777); Edwardsville, IL
February 28, 2026; 3:30 p.m., ESPN+		Lindenwood	L 69–91	5–26 (1–19)	Western Hall (781); Macomb, IL
*Non-conference game. ^{#}Rankings from AP poll. (#) Tournament seedings in parentheses. All times are in Central.
