= 2025–26 Lindenwood Lions men's basketball team =

American college basketball season

2025–26 Lindenwood Lions men's basketball
- Conference: Ohio Valley Conference
- Record: 18–15 (11–9 OVC)
- Head coach: Kyle Gerdeman (7th season)
- Associate head coach: Anthony Beane
- Assistant coaches: Kyle Campbell; Justin Walker; Jestin Anderson
- Home arena: Robert F. Hyland Arena

2025–26 Ohio Valley Conference men's basketball standings
	Conf.				Overall
Team	W		L	PCT	W		L	PCT
Tennessee State †	15	–	5	.750	23	–	9	.719
Morehead State	15	–	5	.750	20	–	13	.606
Southeast Missouri State	14	–	6	.700	20	–	13	.606
UT Martin	13	–	7	.650	22	–	11	.667
SIU Edwardsville	12	–	8	.600	19	–	13	.594
Lindenwood	11	–	9	.550	18	–	15	.545
Little Rock	9	–	11	.450	12	–	20	.375
Eastern Illinois	8	–	12	.400	13	–	20	.394
Tennessee Tech	8	–	12	.400	13	–	18	.419
Southern Indiana	4	–	16	.200	7	–	23	.233
Western Illinois	1	–	19	.050	5	–	26	.161
† 2026 OVC tournament winner As of March 7, 2026

The 2025–26 Lindenwood Lions men's basketball team represented Lindenwood University during the 2025–26 NCAA Division I men's basketball season. The Lions, led by seventh-year head coach Kyle Gerdeman, played their home games at the Robert F. Hyland Arena in St. Charles, Missouri as members of the Ohio Valley Conference (OVC). They finished the season 18–15, 11–9 in OVC play to finish in sixth place. They defeated Little Rock in the first round of the OVC tournament before losing to Southeast Missouri State in the quarterfinals.

This season marked the school's final year of a four-year transition period from Division II to Division I. As a result, the Lions were not eligible for NCAA postseason play.

== Previous season ==
The Lions finished the 2024–25 season 16–17, 10–10 in OVC play to finish in sixth place. They were defeated by Tennessee State in the conference tournament quarterfinals.

== Preseason ==
On October 14, 2025, the OVC released their preseason polls. Lindenwood was picked to finish fifth in the conference.

=== Preseason rankings ===
ASUN Preseason Coaches Poll
Place	Team	Votes
1	Little Rock	188 (12)
2	Southeast Missouri State	177 (6)
3	SIU Edwardsville	163 (1)
4	Tennessee State	135 (1)
T-5	Lindenwood	100
T-5	Morehead State	100
7	Tennessee Tech	80
8	UT Martin	79
9	Southern Indiana	67 (2)
10	Eastern Illinois	63
11	Western Illinois	57
(#) first-place votes

=== Players to Watch ===
Each OVC team selected two "Players to Watch" for their team.

Players to Watch
Player	Position	Year
Anias Futrell	Guard	Senior
Mekhi Cooper	Guard	Junior

== Roster ==
2025–26 Lindenwood Lions men's basketball team
Players
Coaches

Pos.	#	Name	Height	Weight	Year	Hometown
G	0	Mekhi Cooper	6 ft 0 in (1.83 m)	185 lb (84 kg)	Jr	Bolingbrook, IL
G	1	Dontrez Williams	6 ft 5 in (1.96 m)	195 lb (88 kg)	So	Sikeston, MO
G	3	Tidiane d’Almeida	6 ft 1 in (1.85 m)	185 lb (84 kg)	Fr	Serres-Castet, France
F	5	Jaylon McDaniel	6 ft 7 in (2.01 m)	220 lb (100 kg)	Sr	Kansas City, MO
C	7	Milos Nenadic	6 ft 10 in (2.08 m)	240 lb (109 kg)	GS	Kitchener, ON
G	8	Anias Futrell	6 ft 5 in (1.96 m)	195 lb (88 kg)	Sr	St. Louis, MO
G	10	Jadis Jones	6 ft 5 in (1.96 m)	215 lb (98 kg)	So	New Madrid, MO
G	11	Jalen Bouknight	6 ft 0 in (1.83 m)	180 lb (82 kg)	RS Jr	Odenton, MD
G	12	William Campbell	6 ft 4 in (1.93 m)	180 lb (82 kg)	Fr	Los Angeles, CA
G	15	Daniel Kwon	6 ft 4 in (1.93 m)	190 lb (86 kg)	Fr	Pullman, WA
C	21	Kevin Anthony	6 ft 10 in (2.08 m)	245 lb (111 kg)	Jr	Chicago, IL
F	22	Robert Lewis	6 ft 9 in (2.06 m)	205 lb (93 kg)	Jr	St. Louis, MO
F	24	Jeremiah Talton	6 ft 6 in (1.98 m)	220 lb (100 kg)	RS Jr	Quincy, IL
F	25	Todd Bieg	6 ft 6 in (1.98 m)	205 lb (93 kg)	GS	Villa Ridge, MO
G	34	Clayton Jackson	6 ft 2 in (1.88 m)	185 lb (84 kg)	So	St. Louis, MO

Head coach

- Kyle Gerdeman (Southeast Missouri State)

Assistant coach(es)

- Anthony Beane (Kansas State)
- Kyle Campbell (Hastings)
- Justin Walker (Eastern Illinois)
- Jestin Anderson (Quincy)

Legend

- (C) Team captain
- (S) Suspended
- (I) Ineligible
- (W) Walk-on
- Injured
- Current redshirt

Roster
Last update: November 29, 2025

== Schedule and results ==
Date time, TV	Rank^{#}	Opponent^{#}	Result	Record	Site (attendance) city, state
Exhibition
October 29, 2025*; 7:00 p.m.		Southern Illinois	L 76–86	–	Robert F. Hyland Arena (777); St. Charles, MO
Regular season
November 4, 2025*; 7:00 p.m., ESPN+		at No. 10 Texas Tech	L 60–98	0–1	United Supermarkets Arena (8,056); Lubbock, TX
November 6, 2025*; 6:00 p.m., ESPN+		UHSP	W 116–51	1–1	Robert F. Hyland Arena (867); St. Charles, MO
November 10, 2025*; 7:00 p.m., ESPN+		at Saint Louis	L 66–109	1–2	Robert F. Hyland Arena (3,710); St. Charles, MO
November 14, 2025*; 5:30 p.m., SWAC TV		vs. Charleston Southern; Bulldog Bash	W 83–77	2–2	AAMU Event Center (190); Huntsville, AL
November 16, 2025*; 3:00 p.m., SWAC TV		at Alabama A&M; Bulldog Bash	L 65–74	2–3	AAMU Event Center (1,250); Huntsville, AL
November 20, 2025*; 5:00 p.m., Big Ten Network		at Indiana	L 53–73	2–4	Simon Skjodt Assembly Hall (17,222); Bloomington, IN
November 24, 2025*; 6:00 p.m., Big Ten Network		Kansas City	W 80–67	3–4	Robert F. Hyland Arena (725); St. Charles, MO
December 2, 2025*; 7:00 p.m., ESPN+		at Northern Illinois	W 99–64	4–4	NIU Convocation Center (824); DeKalb, IL
December 6, 2025; 7:00 p.m., ESPN+		at Eastern Illinois	W 82–74	5–4 (1–0)	Groniger Arena (920); Charleston, IL
December 9, 2025*; 6:00 p.m., ESPN+		Culver–Stockton	W 110–44	6–4	Robert F. Hyland Arena (466); St. Charles, MO
December 18, 2025; 7:30 p.m., ESPN+		Western Illinois	W 92–76	7–4 (2–0)	Robert F. Hyland Arena (1,034); St. Charles, MO
December 20, 2025*; 1:00 p.m., ESPN+		Harris–Stowe State	W 109–52	8–4	Robert F. Hyland Arena (335); St. Charles, MO
December 23, 2025*; 2:00 p.m., ESPN+		at Missouri State	L 65–70	8–5	Great Southern Bank Arena (1,286); Springfield, MO
January 1, 2026; 3:30 p.m., ESPN+		Morehead State	W 77–64	9–5 (3–0)	Robert F. Hyland Arena (1,301); St. Charles, MO
January 3, 2026; 3:30 p.m., ESPN+		Southern Indiana	W 83–80	10–5 (4–0)	Robert F. Hyland Arena (913); St. Charles, MO
January 6, 2026; 7:30 p.m., ESPN+		at SIU Edwardsville	L 62–66	10–6 (4–1)	First Community Arena (1,477); Edwardsville, IL
January 10, 2026; 3:30 p.m., ESPN+		Little Rock	L 74–82	10–7 (4–2)	Robert F. Hyland Arena (1,016); St. Charles, MO
January 15, 2026; 8:00 p.m., ESPNU		at Southeast Missouri State	W 88–76	11–7 (5–2)	Show Me Center (3,892); Cape Girardeau, MO
January 17, 2026; 3:30 p.m., ESPN+		at UT Martin	L 55–69	11–8 (5–3)	Skyhawk Arena (1,567); Martin, TN
January 22, 2026; 7:30 p.m., ESPN+		Tennessee Tech	W 89–68	12–8 (6–3)	Robert F. Hyland Arena (1,057); St. Charles, MO
January 24, 2026; 3:30 p.m., ESPN+		Tennessee State	L 86–96	12–9 (6–4)	Robert F. Hyland Arena (815); St. Charles, MO
January 29, 2026; 7:30 p.m., ESPN+		at Southern Indiana	W 73–60	13–9 (7–4)	Liberty Arena (1,081); Evansville, IN
January 31, 2026; 2:30 p.m., ESPN+		at Morehead State	W 79–78	14–9 (8–4)	Ellis Johnson Arena (1,177); Morehead, KY
February 3, 2026; 7:30 p.m., ESPN+		SIU Edwardsville	L 72–78	14–10 (8–5)	Robert F. Hyland Arena (1,110); St. Charles, MO
February 5, 2026; 7:00 p.m., ESPN+		at Little Rock	W 79–74	15–10 (9–5)	Jack Stephens Center (1,513); Little Rock, AR
February 12, 2026; 7:30 p.m., ESPN+		UT Martin	W 75–74	16–10 (10–5)	Robert F. Hyland Arena (1,005); St. Charles, MO
February 14, 2026; 3:30 p.m., ESPN+		Southeast Missouri State	L 61–73	16–11 (10–6)	Robert F. Hyland Arena (2,001); St. Charles, MO
February 19, 2026; 7:30 p.m., ESPN+		at Tennessee State	L 80–89	16–12 (10–7)	Gentry Center (256); Nashville, TN
February 21, 2026; 3:00 p.m., ESPN+		at Tennessee Tech	L 57–72	16–13 (10–8)	Hooper Eblen Center (1,247); Cookeville, TN
February 26, 2026; 7:30 p.m., ESPN+		Eastern Illinois	L 67–71	16–14 (10–9)	Robert F. Hyland Arena (1,289); St. Charles, MO
February 28, 2026; 3:30 p.m., ESPN+		at Western Illinois	W 91–69	17–14 (11–9)	Western Hall (781); Macomb, IL
OVC tournament
March 4, 2026; 8:30 p.m., ESPN+	(6)	vs. (7) Little Rock; First round	W 72–62	18–14	Ford Center (929); Evansville, IN
March 5, 2026; 8:30 p.m., ESPN+	(6)	vs. (3) Southeast Missouri State; Quarterfinals	L 66–68	18–15	Ford Center (1,101); Evansville, IN
*Non-conference game. ^{#}Rankings from AP poll. (#) Tournament seedings in parentheses. All times are in Central.
