= 2025–26 Morehead State Eagles men's basketball team =

American college basketball season

2025–26 Morehead State Eagles men's basketball

Ohio Valley regular season co-champions
- Conference: Ohio Valley Conference
- Record: 20–13 (15–5 OVC)
- Head coach: Jonathan Mattox (2nd season)
- Associate head coach: Jason Taylor
- Assistant coaches: Ky Klingsick; Bryan Sherrer; Ben Sisson
- Home arena: Ellis Johnson Arena

2025–26 Ohio Valley Conference men's basketball standings
	Conf.				Overall
Team	W		L	PCT	W		L	PCT
Tennessee State †	15	–	5	.750	23	–	10	.697
Morehead State	15	–	5	.750	20	–	13	.606
Southeast Missouri State	14	–	6	.700	20	–	13	.606
UT Martin	13	–	7	.650	22	–	11	.667
SIU Edwardsville	12	–	8	.600	19	–	13	.594
Lindenwood	11	–	9	.550	18	–	15	.545
Little Rock	9	–	11	.450	12	–	20	.375
Eastern Illinois	8	–	12	.400	13	–	20	.394
Tennessee Tech	8	–	12	.400	13	–	18	.419
Southern Indiana	4	–	16	.200	7	–	23	.233
Western Illinois	1	–	19	.050	5	–	26	.161
† 2026 OVC tournament winner

The 2025–26 Morehead State Eagles men's basketball team represented Morehead State University in the 2025–26 NCAA Division I men's basketball season. The Eagles were led by second-year head coach Jonathan Mattox and played their home games at Ellis Johnson Arena in Morehead, Kentucky as members of the Ohio Valley Conference (OVC).

== Previous season ==
The Eagles finished the 2024–25 season 15–17, 10–10 in OVC play, to finish in a three-way tie for fifth place. In the OVC tournament, they were defeated by Lindenwood in the first round.

== Preseason ==
On October 14, 2025, the OVC released their preseason polls. Morehead State was picked to finish fifth in the conference.

=== Preseason rankings ===
ASUN Preseason Coaches Poll
Place	Team	Votes
1	Little Rock	188 (12)
2	Southeast Missouri State	177 (6)
3	SIU Edwardsville	163 (1)
4	Tennessee State	135 (1)
T-5	Lindenwood	100
T-5	Morehead State	100
7	Tennessee Tech	80
8	UT Martin	79
9	Southern Indiana	67 (2)
10	Eastern Illinois	63
11	Western Illinois	57
(#) first-place votes

=== Players to Watch ===
Each OVC team selected two "Players to Watch" for their team.

Players to Watch
Player	Position	Year
Davion Cunningham	Guard	Redshirt Junior
Chase Dawson	Guard	Sophomore

== Roster ==
2025–26 Morehead State Eagles men's basketball team
Players
Coaches

Pos.	#	Name	Height	Weight	Year	Hometown
G	0	Josiah LeGree	6 ft 0 in (1.83 m)	165 lb (75 kg)	So	Baltimore, MD
G	1	Jacob Wilson	6 ft 6 in (1.98 m)	210 lb (95 kg)	Sr	Baton Rouge, LA
G	2	Davion Cunningham	6 ft 3 in (1.91 m)	185 lb (84 kg)	RS Jr	Charlotte, NC
G	3	George Marshall	6 ft 4 in (1.93 m)	185 lb (84 kg)	Sr	Jackson, MS
F	4	Jon Carroll	6 ft 7 in (2.01 m)	215 lb (98 kg)	Jr	Tallahassee, FL
G	5	Vince Dawson III	6 ft 6 in (1.98 m)	215 lb (98 kg)	Fr	Georgetown, KY
F	8	Anouar Mellouk	6 ft 8 in (2.03 m)	215 lb (98 kg)	RS Sr	Amsterdam, Netherlands
G	10	Chase Dawson	6 ft 0 in (1.83 m)	170 lb (77 kg)	So	Durham, NC
G	11	Jarvis Wright	6 ft 1 in (1.85 m)	185 lb (84 kg)	Fr	Folkston, GA
G	12	Jace Winkleman	6 ft 3 in (1.91 m)	170 lb (77 kg)	RS Fr	Morehead, KY
F	15	Jaden Priester	6 ft 8 in (2.03 m)	215 lb (98 kg)	Fr	Augusta, GA
F	22	Tyonne Farrell	6 ft 6 in (1.98 m)	215 lb (98 kg)	So	Baltimore, MD
C	24	Tamaury Releford	6 ft 9 in (2.06 m)	230 lb (104 kg)	Sr	Fort Smith, AR
F	33	Clayton Parker	6 ft 8 in (2.03 m)	230 lb (104 kg)	Fr	Montgomery City, MO

Head coach

- Jonathan Mattox (Emmanuel)

Assistant coach(es)

- Jason Taylor (Jacksonville State)
- Ky Klingsick (Oklahoma State)
- Bryan Sherrer (Murray State)
- Ben Sisson (Kentucky Wesleyan)

Legend

- (C) Team captain
- (S) Suspended
- (I) Ineligible
- (W) Walk-on
- Injured
- Current redshirt

Roster
Last update: November 9, 2025

== Schedule and results ==
Date time, TV	Rank^{#}	Opponent^{#}	Result	Record	Site (attendance) city, state
Exhibition
October 27, 2025*; 6:30 p.m.		at Eastern Kentucky	L 93–107	–	Ellis Johnson Arena (1,767); Morehead, KY
Regular season
November 3, 2025*; 7:00 p.m., ESPN+		Midway	W 89–84	1–0	Ellis Johnson Arena (1,482); Morehead, KY
November 7, 2025*; 7:00 p.m., ACCNX		at Wake Forest	L 65–81	1–1	LJVM Coliseum (6,689); Winston-Salem, NC
November 9, 2025*; 2:00 p.m., SECN+		at Georgia	L 81–120	1–2	Stegeman Coliseum (5,706); Athens, GA
November 11, 2025*; 7:00 p.m., ACCNX		at Clemson	L 56–83	1–3	Littlejohn Coliseum (6,357); Clemson, SC
November 16, 2025*; 12:30 p.m., ESPN+		Kentucky Christian	W 121–51	2–3	Ellis Johnson Arena (1,013); Morehead, KY
November 21, 2025*; 7:00 p.m., ESPN+		at East Tennessee State; ETSU MTE	L 62–77	2–4	Freedom Hall Civic Center; Johnson City, TN
November 22, 2025*; 7:00 p.m.		vs. Louisiana–Monroe; ESTU MTE	W 83–80	3–4	Freedom Hall Civic Center (57); Johnson City, TN
November 29, 2025*; 2:00 p.m., ESPN+		at IU Indy	L 80–85	3–5	The Jungle (564); Indianapolis, IN
December 2, 2025*; 8:00 p.m., ESPN+		at Murray State	L 52–84	3–6	CFSB Center (4,716); Murray, KY
December 6, 2025*; 2:00 p.m., ESPN+		at Presbyterian	L 72–80	3–7	Templeton Center (243); Clinton, SC
December 16, 2025; 7:30 p.m., ESPN+		Little Rock	W 78–64	4–7 (1–0)	Ellis Johnson Arena (1,042); Morehead, KY
December 20, 2025; 4:30 p.m., ESPN+		at Southern Indiana	W 64–60 ^{OT}	5–7 (2–0)	Liberty Arena (1,245); Evansville, IN
December 28, 2025*; 2:00 p.m., ESPN+		Alice Lloyd	W 115–65	6–7	Ellis Johnson Arena (1,056); Morehead, KY
January 1, 2026; 4:30 p.m., ESPN+		at Lindenwood	L 64–77	6–8 (2–1)	Hyland Performance Arena (1,301); St. Charles, MO
January 3, 2026; 4:30 p.m., ESPN+		at SIU Edwardsville	W 73–72	7–8 (3–1)	First Community Arena (1,869); Edwardsville, IL
January 8, 2026; 7:30 p.m., ESPN+		UT Martin	L 68–76	7–9 (3–2)	Ellis Johnson Arena (1,018); Morehead, KY
January 10, 2026; 3:30 p.m., ESPN+		Southeast Missouri State	W 71–69	8–9 (4–2)	Ellis Johnson Arena (1,117); Morehead, KY
January 15, 2026; 8:30 p.m., ESPN+		at Tennessee State	L 100–105 ^{OT}	8–10 (4–3)	Gentry Complex (567); Nashville, TN
January 17, 2026; 4:00 p.m., ESPN+		at Tennessee Tech	W 76–70	9–10 (5–3)	Eblen Center (1,175); Cookeville, TN
January 22, 2026; 7:30 p.m., ESPN+		Western Illinois	W 71–66	10–10 (6–3)	Ellis Johnson Arena (1,234); Morehead, KY
January 24, 2026; 12:30 p.m., ESPN+		Eastern Illinois	W 73–68	11–10 (7–3)	Ellis Johnson Arena (1,013); Morehead, KY
January 29, 2026; 7:30 p.m., ESPN+		SIU Edwardsville	W 67–65	12–10 (8–3)	Ellis Johnson Arena (1,065); Morehead, KY
January 31, 2026; 3:30 p.m., ESPN+		Lindenwood	L 78–79	12–11 (8–4)	Ellis Johnson Arena (1,177); Morehead, KY
February 5, 2026; 8:30 p.m., ESPN+		at Southeast Missouri State	L 70–82	12–12 (8–5)	Show Me Center (1,930); Cape Girardeau, MO
February 7, 2026; 4:00 p.m., ESPNU		at UT Martin	W 61–55	13–12 (9–5)	Skyhawk Arena (2,040); Martin, TN
February 12, 2026; 7:30 p.m., ESPN+		Tennessee Tech	W 73–66	14–12 (10–5)	Ellis Johnson Arena (2,234); Morehead, KY
February 14, 2026; 3:30 p.m., ESPN+		Tennessee State	W 94–86	15–12 (11–5)	Ellis Johnson Arena (1,786); Morehead, KY
February 19, 2026; 8:30 p.m., ESPN+		at Eastern Illinois	W 73–70	16–12 (12–5)	Lantz Arena (1,818); Charleston, IL
February 21, 2026; 4:30 p.m., ESPN+		at Western Illinois	W 81–59	17–12 (13–5)	Western Hall (624); Macomb, IL
February 24, 2026; 7:30 p.m., ESPN+		Southern Indiana	W 64–63	18–12 (14–5)	Ellis Johnson Arena (1,567); Morehead, KY
February 26, 2026; 8:00 p.m., ESPN+		at Little Rock	W 76–70	19–12 (15–5)	Jack Stephens Center (1,978); Little Rock, AR
OVC tournament
March 6, 2026; 10:30 p.m., ESPNU	(2)	vs. (3) Southeast Missouri State; Semifinals	W 66–61	20–12	Ford Center (1,487); Evansville, IN
March 7, 2026; 9:00 p.m., ESPN2	(2)	vs. (1) Tennessee State; Championship	L 67–93	20–13	Ford Center (1,545); Evansville, IN
*Non-conference game. ^{#}Rankings from AP poll. (#) Tournament seedings in parentheses. All times are in Eastern.
