= 2025–26 UT Martin Skyhawks men's basketball team =

American college basketball season

2025–26 UT Martin Skyhawks men's basketball
- Conference: Ohio Valley Conference
- Record: 22–11 (13–7 OVC)
- Head coach: Jeremy Shulman (2nd season)
- Assistant coaches: John Aiken; Mark White; Séllé Hann; Truman Moore; Jawaan Holmes Nick Johnson
- Home arena: Skyhawk Arena

2025–26 Ohio Valley Conference men's basketball standings
	Conf.				Overall
Team	W		L	PCT	W		L	PCT
Tennessee State †	15	–	5	.750	23	–	10	.697
Morehead State	15	–	5	.750	20	–	13	.606
Southeast Missouri State	14	–	6	.700	20	–	13	.606
UT Martin	13	–	7	.650	22	–	11	.667
SIU Edwardsville	12	–	8	.600	19	–	13	.594
Lindenwood	11	–	9	.550	18	–	15	.545
Little Rock	9	–	11	.450	12	–	20	.375
Eastern Illinois	8	–	12	.400	13	–	20	.394
Tennessee Tech	8	–	12	.400	13	–	18	.419
Southern Indiana	4	–	16	.200	7	–	23	.233
Western Illinois	1	–	19	.050	5	–	26	.161
† 2026 OVC tournament winner

The 2025–26 UT Martin Skyhawks men's basketball team represented the University of Tennessee at Martin during the 2025–26 NCAA Division I men's basketball season. The Skyhawks were led by second-year head coach Jeremy Shulman, and played their home games at Skyhawk Arena located in Martin, Tennessee as members of the Ohio Valley Conference.

== Previous season ==
The Skyhawks finished the 2024–25 season 14–19, 9–11 in OVC play, to finish in eighth place. As the No. 8 seed in the OVC tournament, they defeated Tennessee Tech in the first round, before losing in the quarterfinals to Little Rock.

== Preseason ==
On October 14, 2025, the OVC released their preseason polls. UT Martin was picked to finish eighth in the conference.

=== Preseason rankings ===
ASUN Preseason Coaches Poll
Place	Team	Votes
1	Little Rock	188 (12)
2	Southeast Missouri State	177 (6)
3	SIU Edwardsville	163 (1)
4	Tennessee State	135 (1)
T-5	Lindenwood	100
T-5	Morehead State	100
7	Tennessee Tech	80
8	UT Martin	79
9	Southern Indiana	67 (2)
10	Eastern Illinois	63
11	Western Illinois	57
(#) first-place votes

=== Players to Watch ===
Each OVC team selected two "Players to Watch" for their team.

Players to Watch
Player	Position	Year
Afan Trnka	Guard	Junior
Lamine Niang	Forward	Redshirt junior

== Roster ==
2025–26 UT Martin Skyhawks men's basketball team
Players
Coaches

Pos.	#	Name	Height	Weight	Year	Previous school	Hometown
G/F	0	Andrija Bukumirović	6 ft 7 in (2.01 m)	200 lb (91 kg)	Jr	Eastern Florida State College/Gimnazija Novi Pazar	Sjenica, Serbia
G	1	Will Hopkins	6 ft 5 in (1.96 m)	180 lb (82 kg)	So	Colorado College/Holy Innocents' Episcopal School	Atlanta, GA
G	2	Enrique Moya	5 ft 11 in (1.8 m)	150 lb (68 kg)	Fr	Colegio Marista La Inmaculada Granada	Grenada, Spain
F	3	James Bass	6 ft 8 in (2.03 m)	200 lb (91 kg)	RS Fr	Campbell Hall School	Banjul, Gambia
G	4	Afan Trnka	6 ft 2 in (1.88 m)	180 lb (82 kg)	Jr	Eastern Florida State College/Bishop Mora Salesian HS	Sarajevo, Bosnia and Herzegovina
G	5	Damien King	6 ft 4 in (1.93 m)	200 lb (91 kg)	Fr	Anderson HS	Anderson, IN
G/F	6	Charlie King	6 ft 5 in (1.96 m)	185 lb (84 kg)	Jr	Southeastern Illinois College/Vienna HS	Ozark, IL
G	7	Dragos Lungu	6 ft 6 in (1.98 m)	180 lb (82 kg)	RS So	San Diego/NBA Global Academy	Cluj-Napoca, Romania
G	9	Pedro Santos	6 ft 7 in (2.01 m)	200 lb (91 kg)	RS Fr	Colégio Júlio Dinis	Porto, Portugal
F	10	Ama Sow	6 ft 9 in (2.06 m)	220 lb (100 kg)	Fr	Montour HS	Dakar, Senegal
G/F	11	AJ Hopkins	6 ft 6 in (1.98 m)	195 lb (88 kg)	Sr	Florida SouthWestern State/Whitefield Academy	Atlanta, GA
G	22	Ty Price	5 ft 10 in (1.78 m)	180 lb (82 kg)	Fr	Butler County HS	Morgantown, KY
G	23	Lucas Williams	6 ft 3 in (1.91 m)	185 lb (84 kg)	So	Prestige Worldwide Sports Academy	Altamonte Springs, FL
F	24	Vladimir Khryapa	6 ft 8 in (2.03 m)	205 lb (93 kg)	Fr	Golden State Prep	Moscow, Russia
G	32	Filip Petkovski	6 ft 5 in (1.96 m)	185 lb (84 kg)	Fr	Elementary School Jakob Aljaž	Kranj, Slovenia
G	33	Filip Radaković	6 ft 7 in (2.01 m)	200 lb (91 kg)	So	Prva Sportska Kosarkaska Gimnazija Koledz Beograd	Belgrade, Serbia
F	34	Lamine Niang	6 ft 9 in (2.06 m)	230 lb (104 kg)	RS Jr	Cal State Northridge/Central Pointe Christian Academy	Thiès, Senegal
F	44	Matas Deniusas	6 ft 9 in (2.06 m)	220 lb (100 kg)	Fr	Vilniaus Žveryno Gimnazija	Vilnius, Lithuania
F	77	Luca Colceag	6 ft 8 in (2.03 m)	200 lb (91 kg)	Sr	Northern Colorado/CS Universitatea Cluj-Napoca	Bucharest, Romania

Head coach

- Jeremy Shulman (Middle Tennessee State)

Assistant coach(es)

- Drew Kelly (Villanova)
- Séllé Hann (Vanguard)
- Mark White (Austin Peay)
- Truman Moore (McNeese State)
- Jawaan Holmes (Fairmont State)
- Nick Johnson (North Florida)

Legend

- (C) Team captain
- (S) Suspended
- (I) Ineligible
- (W) Walk-on
- Injured
- Current redshirt

Roster

== Schedule and results ==
Date time, TV	Rank^{#}	Opponent^{#}	Result	Record	Site (attendance) city, state
Non-conference regular season
November 4, 2025*; 9:00 pm, Mountain West Network		at UNLV	W 86–81	1–0	Thomas & Mack Center (5,235); Las Vegas, NV
November 9, 2025*; 6:30 pm, ESPN+		Kentucky Christian	W 97–42	2–0	Skyhawk Arena (1,626); Martin, TN
November 12, 2025*; 7:30 pm, ESPN+		at Bradley	W 78–67	3–0	Carver Arena (5,096); Peoria, IL
November 18, 2025*; 6:00 pm, ACCNX		at Florida State	L 73–87	3–1	Donald L. Tucker Center (4,367); Tallahassee, FL
November 22, 2025*; 4:00 pm, YouTube		vs. Prairie View A&M; Pensacola Invitational	W 69–68	4–1	Pensacola Bay Center (874); Pensacola, FL
November 23, 2025*; 4:30 pm, YouTube		vs. Southern Miss; Pensacola Invitational	L 60–70	4–2	Pensacola Bay Center (932); Pensacola, FL
November 25, 2025*; 6:00 pm, ESPN+		Brescia	W 75–50	5–2	Skyhawk Arena (872); Martin, TN
December 2, 2025*; 2:00 pm, ESPN+		Charleston Southern	W 73–56	6–2	Skyhawk Arena (4,513); Martin, TN
December 7, 2025*; 2:00 pm, ESPN+		Alabama State	W 74–64	7–2	Skyhawk Arena (1,166); Martin, TN
December 10, 2025*; 7:00 pm, ESPN+		at Southern Illinois	L 54–83	7–3	Banterra Center (4,021); Carbondale, IL
December 14, 2025*; 4:30 pm, ESPN+		Champion Christian	W 96–52	8–3	Skyhawk Arena (608); Martin, TN
OVC regular season
December 18, 2025; 7:30 pm, ESPN+		Tennessee State	L 71–78	8–4 (0–1)	Skyhawk Arena (307); Martin, TN
December 20, 2025; 3:00 pm, ESPN+		at Tennessee Tech	W 86–62	9–4 (1–1)	Eblen Center (875); Cookeville, TN
January 1, 2026; 3:30 pm, ESPN+		Western Illinois	W 67–60	10–4 (2–1)	Skyhawk Arena (1,144); Martin, TN
January 3, 2026; 3:30 pm, ESPN+		Eastern Illinois	W 65–61	11–4 (3–1)	Skyhawk Arena (1,086); Martin, TN
January 8, 2026; 6:30 pm, ESPN+		at Morehead State	W 76–68	12–4 (4–1)	Ellis Johnson Arena (1,018); Morehead, KY
January 10, 2026; 7:30 pm, ESPN+		at Southern Indiana	W 73–56	13–4 (5–1)	Liberty Arena (1,064); Evansville, IN
January 15, 2026; 7:30 pm, ESPN+		SIU Edwardsville	W 65–59	14–4 (6–1)	Skyhawk Arena (1,753); Martin, TN
January 17, 2026; 3:30 pm, ESPN+		Lindenwood	W 69–55	15–4 (7–1)	Skyhawk Arena (1,567); Martin, TN
January 20, 2026; 7:30 pm, ESPN+		at Southeast Missouri State	L 50–66	15–5 (7–2)	Show Me Center (1,924); Cape Girardeau, MO
January 29, 2026; 7:30 pm, ESPN+		at Eastern Illinois	W 76–68	16–5 (8–2)	Groniger Arena (1,437); Charleston, IL
January 31, 2026; 3:30 pm, ESPN+		at Western Illinois	W 84–44	17–5 (9–2)	Western Hall (568); Macomb, IL
February 3, 2026; 7:30 pm, ESPN+		Little Rock	W 55–52	18–5 (10–2)	Skyhawk Arena (1,208); Martin, TN
February 5, 2026; 7:30 pm, ESPN+		Southern Indiana	W 76–54	19–5 (11–2)	Skyhawk Arena (1,240); Martin, TN
February 7, 2026; 3:00 pm, ESPNU		Morehead State	L 55–61	19–6 (11–3)	Skyhawk Arena (2,040); Martin, TN
February 12, 2026; 7:30 pm, ESPN+		at Lindenwood	L 74–75	19–7 (11–4)	Robert F. Hyland Arena (1,005); St. Charles, MO
February 14, 2026; 3:30 pm, ESPN+		at SIU Edwardsville	W 81–76	20–7 (12–4)	First Community Arena (1,927); Edwardsville, IL
February 17, 2026; 7:30 pm, ESPN+		Southeast Missouri State	L 53–56 ^{OT}	20–8 (12–5)	Skyhawk Arena (1,322); Martin, TN
February 19, 2026; 7:00 pm, ESPN+		at Little Rock	L 65–67	20–9 (12–6)	Jack Stephens Center (1,032); Little Rock, AR
February 26, 2026; 7:30 pm, ESPN+		Tennessee Tech	W 64–49	21–9 (13–6)	Skyhawk Arena (1,297); Martin, TN
February 28, 2026; 3:30 pm, ESPN+		Tennessee State	L 42–67	21–10 (13–7)	Skyhawk Arena (2,104); Martin, TN
OVC tournament
March 5, 2026; 6:00 pm, ESPN+	(4)	vs. (8) Eastern Illinois; Quarterfinals	W 66–63	22–10	Ford Center; Evansville, IN
March 6, 2026; 7:00 pm, ESPNU	(4)	vs. (1) Tennessee State; Semifinals	L 55–68	22–11	Ford Center; Evansville, IN
*Non-conference game. ^{#}Rankings from AP Poll. (#) Tournament seedings in parentheses. All times are in Central.
