= 2025–26 Tennessee Tech Golden Eagles men's basketball team =

American college basketball season

2025–26 Tennessee Tech Golden Eagles men's basketball
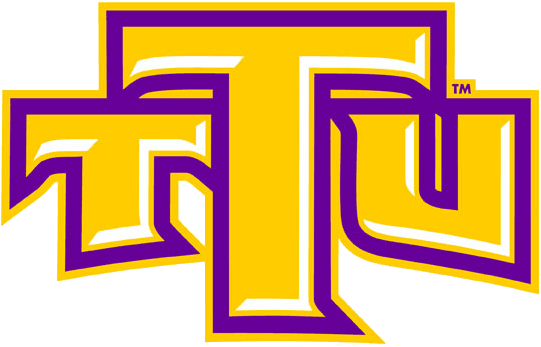
- Conference: Ohio Valley Conference
- Record: 13–18 (8–12 OVC)
- Head coach: John Pelphrey (7th season)
- Associate head coach: Blake Gray (7th season)
- Assistant coaches: Stefan King (4th season); Ezra Pinzur (1st season); Ronrico White (1st season); Miloš Babić (2nd season)
- Home arena: Eblen Center

2025–26 Ohio Valley Conference men's basketball standings
	Conf.				Overall
Team	W		L	PCT	W		L	PCT
Tennessee State †	15	–	5	.750	23	–	10	.697
Morehead State	15	–	5	.750	20	–	13	.606
Southeast Missouri State	14	–	6	.700	20	–	13	.606
UT Martin	13	–	7	.650	22	–	11	.667
SIU Edwardsville	12	–	8	.600	19	–	13	.594
Lindenwood	11	–	9	.550	18	–	15	.545
Little Rock	9	–	11	.450	12	–	20	.375
Eastern Illinois	8	–	12	.400	13	–	20	.394
Tennessee Tech	8	–	12	.400	13	–	18	.419
Southern Indiana	4	–	16	.200	7	–	23	.233
Western Illinois	1	–	19	.050	5	–	26	.161
† 2026 OVC tournament winner

The 2025–26 Tennessee Tech Golden Eagles men's basketball team represented Tennessee Technological University during the 2025–26 NCAA Division I men's basketball season. The Golden Eagles were led by John Pelphrey in his seventh and final year as head coach, and played their home games at the Eblen Center in Cookeville, Tennessee as members of the Ohio Valley Conference. They finished the season 13–18, 8–12 in OVC play to finish in a tie for eighth place. They failed to qualify for the OVC tournament.

On March 3, 2026, the school fired head coach John Pelphrey. On March 12, the school named former Fairleigh Dickinson and Iona head coach, Tobin Anderson, the team's new head coach.

On August 13, 2025, the school announced that the season would be the last for the team in the Ohio Valley Conference, as they would join the Southern Conference on July 1, 2026.

== Previous season ==
The Golden Eagles finished the 2024–25 season 15–17, 10–10 in OVC play to finish tied for fifth place. They were defeated by UT Martin in the first round of the OVC tournament.

== Preseason ==
On October 14, 2025, the OVC released their preseason polls. Tennessee Tech was picked to finish seventh in the conference.

=== Preseason rankings ===
ASUN Preseason Coaches Poll
Place	Team	Votes
1	Little Rock	188 (12)
2	Southeast Missouri State	177 (6)
3	SIU Edwardsville	163 (1)
4	Tennessee State	135 (1)
T-5	Lindenwood	100
T-5	Morehead State	100
7	Tennessee Tech	80
8	UT Martin	79
9	Southern Indiana	67 (2)
10	Eastern Illinois	63
11	Western Illinois	57
(#) first-place votes

=== Players to Watch ===
Each OVC team selected two "Players to Watch" for their team.

Players to Watch
Player	Position	Year
JaJuan Nicholls	Forward	Junior
Mekhi Cameron	Guard	Graduate Senior

== Roster ==
2025–26 Tennessee Tech Golden Eagles men's basketball team
Players
Coaches

Pos.	#	Name	Height	Weight	Year	Hometown
G	0	Malik Ferguson	6 ft 4 in (1.93 m)	190 lb (86 kg)	Jr	Grovetown, Georgia
G	1	Mekhi Cameron	6 ft 4 in (1.93 m)	195 lb (88 kg)	RS Sr	Atlanta, Georgia
G/F	2	Jacobe Whitted	6 ft 7 in (2.01 m)	205 lb (93 kg)	Fr	Birmingham, Alabama
G	3	Jah'Kim Payne	6 ft 6 in (1.98 m)	181 lb (82 kg)	Jr	Atlanta, Georgia
F	4	Mekhi Turner	6 ft 8 in (2.03 m)	215 lb (98 kg)	So	Atlanta, Georgia
G	5	Ja'Quavian Florence	6 ft 4 in (1.93 m)	195 lb (88 kg)	GS	Atlanta, Georgia
G	6	Brandon Muntu	6 ft 4 in (1.93 m)	208 lb (94 kg)	GS	Calgary, Alberta
F	7	JuJuan Nicholls	6 ft 8 in (2.03 m)	220 lb (100 kg)	Jr	Scranton, Pennsylvania
G	8	Ty Owens	6 ft 0 in (1.83 m)	185 lb (84 kg)	Jr	Port St. Lucie, Florida
G	10	Grant Slatten	6 ft 5 in (1.96 m)	195 lb (88 kg)	RS Sr	Sparta, Tennessee
F	11	Dani Pounds	6 ft 8 in (2.03 m)	225 lb (102 kg)	Jr	Atlanta, Georgia
G	12	Hagan Preston	6 ft 3 in (1.91 m)	187 lb (85 kg)	Fr	Lexington, Kentucky
G	13	C.J. McPherson	6 ft 3 in (1.91 m)	211 lb (96 kg)	Jr	Virginia Beach, Virginia
G	23	Colin Ayers	6 ft 0 in (1.83 m)	170 lb (77 kg)	RS Fr	Hilham, Tennessee
F	24	Owen Varnado	6 ft 5 in (1.96 m)	215 lb (98 kg)	Sr	Muskegon, Michigan
G	32	Maguire Evans	6 ft 2 in (1.88 m)	180 lb (82 kg)	Fr	Cleveland, Tennessee

Head coach

- John Pelphrey (Kentucky)

Assistant coach(es)

- Blake Gray (Alabama)
- Stefan King (Troy)
- Ezra Pinzur (Tennessee Tech)
- Ronrico White (Chattanooga)
- Miloš Babić (Tennessee Tech)

Legend

- (C) Team captain
- (S) Suspended
- (I) Ineligible
- (W) Walk-on
- Injured
- Current redshirt

Roster
Last update: November 25, 2025

== Schedule and results ==
Date time, TV	Rank^{#}	Opponent^{#}	Result	Record	Site (attendance) city, state
Exhibition
October 21, 2025*; 2:15 p.m.		SC Central Christian College	W 99–38	–	Eblen Center (581); Cookeville, TN
October 27, 2025*; 6:30 p.m.		at Belmont	L 70–74	–	Curb Event Center; Nashville, TN
Non-conference regular season
November 3, 2025*; 6:30 p.m., ESPN+		at Western Kentucky	L 70–82	0–1	E. A. Diddle Arena (3,247); Bowling Green, KY
November 7, 2025*; 6:00 p.m., ESPN+		at Charlotte	L 65–70	0–2	Dale F. Halton Arena (2,699); Charlotte, NC
November 10, 2025*; 6:00 p.m., ESPN+		Virginia–Lynchburg	W 118–58	1–2	Eblen Center (540); Cookeville, TN
November 13, 2025*; 6:00 p.m., ESPN+		Berea	W 86–64	2–2	Eblen Center (667); Cookeville, TN
November 17, 2025*; 6:00 p.m., ESPN+		West Georgia	L 59–61	2–3	Eblen Center (648); Cookeville, TN
November 19, 2025*; 6:00 p.m., ESPN+		at USC Upstate	W 88–84	3–3	G. B. Hodge Center (471); Spartanburg, SC
November 26, 2025*; 6:00 p.m., SECN		at No. 19 Kentucky	L 54–104	3–4	Rupp Arena (19,602); Lexington, KY
November 29, 2025*; 1:00 p.m., SECN+		at Georgia	L 81–123	3–5	Stegeman Coliseum (7,125); Athens, GA
December 3, 2025*; 11:00 a.m., ESPN+		at Lipscomb	L 80–83	3–6	Allen Arena (1,905); Nashville, TN
December 6, 2025*; 1:00 p.m., ESPN+		at West Georgia	W 87–59	4–6	The Coliseum (567); Carrollton, GA
December 13, 2025*; 3:00 p.m., ESPN+		Bethel (TN)	W 101–69	5–6	Eblen Center (855); Cookeville, TN
OVC regular season
December 18, 2025; 7:30 p.m., ESPN+		Southeast Missouri State	W 85–74	6–6 (1–0)	Eblen Center (751); Cookeville, TN
December 20, 2025; 3:00 p.m., ESPN+		UT Martin	L 62–86	6–7 (1–1)	Eblen Center (875); Cookeville, TN
December 30, 2025; 7:30 p.m., ESPN+		Tennessee State	L 76–88	6–8 (1–2)	Eblen Center (1,273); Cookeville, TN
January 1, 2026; 5:00 p.m., ESPN+		at Little Rock	L 58–77	6–9 (1–3)	Jack Stephens Center (1,127); Little Rock, AR
January 8, 2026; 7:30 p.m., ESPN+		at Eastern Illinois	L 61–71	6–10 (1–4)	Lantz Arena (736); Charleston, IL
January 10, 2026; 3:30 p.m., ESPN+		at Western Illinois	W 59–54	7–10 (2–4)	Western Hall (735); Macomb, IL
January 15, 2026; 7:30 p.m., ESPN+		Southern Indiana	L 54–71	7–11 (2–5)	Eblen Center (1,250); Cookeville, TN
January 17, 2026; 3:00 p.m., ESPN+		Morehead State	L 70–76	7–12 (2–6)	Eblen Center (1,175); Cookeville, TN
January 22, 2026; 7:30 p.m., ESPN+		at Lindenwood	L 68–89	7–13 (2–7)	Hyland Performance Arena (1,057); St. Charles, MO
January 24, 2026; 4:00 p.m., ESPN+		at SIU Edwardsville	L 58–62	7–14 (2–8)	First Community Arena (1,623); Edwardsville, IL
January 31, 2026; 3:00 p.m., ESPN+		Little Rock	W 87–77	8–14 (3–8)	Eblen Center (1,101); Cookeville, TN
February 2, 2026; 7:30 p.m., ESPN+		at Tennessee State	W 90–85	9–14 (4–8)	Gentry Center (1,153); Nashville, TN
February 5, 2026; 7:30 p.m., ESPN+		Western Illinois	W 97–72	10–14 (5–8)	Eblen Center (1,038); Cookeville, TN
February 7, 2026; 3:00 p.m., ESPN+		Eastern Illinois	L 54–60	10–15 (5–9)	Eblen Center (1,077); Cookeville, TN
February 12, 2026; 4:00 p.m., ESPN+		at Morehead State	L 66–73	10–16 (5–10)	Ellis Johnson Arena (2,234); Morehead, KY
February 14, 2026; 3:30 p.m., ESPN+		at Southern Indiana	W 82–74	11–16 (6–10)	Liberty Arena (1,769); Evansville, IN
February 19, 2026; 7:30 p.m., ESPN+		SIU Edwardsville	W 62–52	12–16 (7–10)	Eblen Center (1,230); Cookeville, TN
February 21, 2026; 3:00 p.m., ESPN+		Lindenwood	W 72–57	13–16 (8–10)	Eblen Center (1,247); Cookeville, TN
February 26, 2026; 7:30 p.m., ESPN+		at UT Martin	L 49–64	13–17 (8–11)	Skyhawk Arena (1,297); Martin, TN
February 28, 2026; 3:45 p.m., ESPN+		at Southeast Missouri State	L 73–89	13–18 (8–12)	Show Me Center (3,200); Cape Girardeau, MO
*Non-conference game. ^{#}Rankings from AP Poll. (#) Tournament seedings in parentheses. All times are in Central.
