= 2025–26 SIU Edwardsville Cougars men's basketball team =

American college basketball season

2025–26 SIU Edwardsville Cougars men's basketball
- Conference: Ohio Valley Conference
- Record: 19–13 (12–8 OVC)
- Head coach: Brian Barone (7th season)
- Associate head coach: Colin Schneider
- Assistant coaches: Ryan Hellenthal; Garret Covington; Rob Holloway; Mike Waldo (Special assistant to the head coach); Evan Ambrose (Graduate Assistant)
- Home arena: First Community Arena

2025–26 Ohio Valley Conference men's basketball standings
	Conf.				Overall
Team	W		L	PCT	W		L	PCT
Tennessee State †	15	–	5	.750	23	–	10	.697
Morehead State	15	–	5	.750	20	–	13	.606
Southeast Missouri State	14	–	6	.700	20	–	13	.606
UT Martin	13	–	7	.650	22	–	11	.667
SIU Edwardsville	12	–	8	.600	19	–	13	.594
Lindenwood	11	–	9	.550	18	–	15	.545
Little Rock	9	–	11	.450	12	–	20	.375
Eastern Illinois	8	–	12	.400	13	–	20	.394
Tennessee Tech	8	–	12	.400	13	–	18	.419
Southern Indiana	4	–	16	.200	7	–	23	.233
Western Illinois	1	–	19	.050	5	–	26	.161
† 2026 OVC tournament winner

The 2025–26 SIU Edwardsville Cougars men's basketball team represented Southern Illinois University Edwardsville in the 2025–26 NCAA Division I men's basketball season. The Cougars, led by seventh-year head coach Brian Barone, play their home games at the First Community Arena in Edwardsville, Illinois as members of the Ohio Valley Conference (OVC). They finished the regular season 19–13, 12–8 in OVC play to finish in fifth place. They lost to Eastern Illinois in the first round of the OVC tournament.

== Previous season ==
The Cougars finished the 2024–25 season 22–12, 13–7 in OVC play to finish in second place. They defeated Tennessee State and Southeast Missouri State to win the OVC tournament tournament championship. As a result, they received the conference's automatic bid to the NCAA tournament as the No, 16 seed in the Midwest region, the school's first-ever trip to the tournament. There they lost to Houston in the first round.

== Preseason ==
Seven players, including two medical redshirts, returned from the 2024–25 squad. They were joined by three freshmen, a junior college transfer, three transfers from other Division I programs, and a graduate student from a non-Division I school.

In a vote of Ohio Valley Conference head men's basketball coaches and communication directors, SIUE was picked to finish third in the 11-team Ohio Valley Conference.

=== 2025–26 OVC Men's Basketball Preseason Poll ===
1. Little Rock (12 first-place) - 188 points
2. Southeast Missouri (6) - 177
3. SIUE (1) - 163
4. Tennessee State (1) - 135
5. Lindenwood - 100
6. Morehead State - 100
7. Tennessee Tech - 80
8. UT Martin - 79
9. Southern Indiana (2) - 67
10. Eastern Illinois - 63
11. Western Illinois - 57

== Roster ==
2023–24 SIU Edwardsville Cougars men's basketball team
Players
Coaches

Pos.	#	Name	Height	Weight	Year	Previous school	Hometown
F	0	Ring Malith	6 ft 9 in (2.06 m)	180 lb (82 kg)	Sr	Barton CC/Rocky Bayou Christian HS	Twic, South Sudan
G	1	Jordan Pickett	6 ft 3 in (1.91 m)	190 lb (86 kg)	Jr	Belleville East HS	Belleville, IL
G	2	CJ Hall	6 ft 2 in (1.88 m)	175 lb (79 kg)	GS	Nelson/McLennan CC/Mansfield Summit HS	Killeen, TX
F	4	Darrion Baker	6 ft 8 in (2.03 m)	225 lb (102 kg)	RS So	Akron/Hillcrest HS	Chicago, IL
G	5	Jack Campion	5 ft 11 in (1.8 m)	175 lb (79 kg)	Sr	Southern Indiana/Milton HS	Milton, WI
G	7	Darius Robinson	6 ft 1 in (1.85 m)	165 lb (75 kg)	Sr	Oral Roberts/Kenwood Academy	Chicago, IL
G	8	Harrison Alexander	6 ft 5 in (1.96 m)	190 lb (86 kg)	RS So	Mississippi State/Madison-Ridgeland Academy	Madison, MS
G	9	Tyler King	6 ft 4 in (1.93 m)	185 lb (84 kg)	Jr	North Central Missouri/Parkway West HS	Saint Louis, MO
G	11	Dehrio McCaskill	6 ft 3 in (1.91 m)	180 lb (82 kg)	Fr	Vashon HS	Saint Louis, MO
G	17	Corentin Efono	6 ft 4 in (1.93 m)	195 lb (88 kg)	Fr	-	Aalst, Belgium
F	20	Iwo Baganc	6 ft 8 in (2.03 m)	220 lb (100 kg)	Fr	-	Poznań, Poland
F	21	Myles Thompson	6 ft 7 in (2.01 m)	240 lb (109 kg)	Sr	Barton CC/Hutchinson HS	Hutchinson, KS
F	24	Kyle Thomas	6 ft 10 in (2.08 m)	235 lb (107 kg)	Sr	Bradley/Benet Academy	Bolingbrook, IL
F	33	Jo Valrie	6 ft 5 in (1.96 m)	180 lb (82 kg)	GS	Point Park	Houston, TX
C	34	Arnas Sakenis	7 ft 1 in (2.16 m)	260 lb (118 kg)	Sr	Andrew HS	Tinley Park, IL

Head coach

- Brian Barone (Marquette)

Assistant coach(es)

- Colin Schneider (Green Bay)
- Ryan Hellenthal (UIC)
- Garret Covington (Western Illinois)
- Rob Holloway (Eastern Illinois)
- Mike Waldo (SIUE)
- Evan Ambrose (Augustana)

Legend

- (C) Team captain
- (S) Suspended
- (I) Ineligible
- (W) Walk-on
- Injured
- Current redshirt

Roster

== Schedule and results ==
Date time, TV	Rank^{#}	Opponent^{#}	Result	Record	High points	High rebounds	High assists	Site (attendance) city, state
Exhibition Season
October 26, 2025*; 1:00 PM		St. Ambrose; Championship Banner Celebration	W 100–60		17 – Thomas	9 – Sakenis	5 – Campion	First Community Arena; Edwardsville, IL
Non-Conference Season
November 4, 2025*; 6:00 PM, ESPN+		East–West	W 119–50	1–0	16 – Malith	9 – Valrie	5 – Pickett	First Community Arena (1,143); Edwardsville, IL
November 7, 2025*; 12:30 PM, ESPN+		at UTSA	W 77–60	2–0	20 – Malith	10 – Valrrie	4 – Campion	Convocation Center (840); San Antonio, TX
November 10, 2025*; 6:00 PM, ESPN+		Indiana State	L 55–64	2–1	15 – Malith	7 – Pickett	3 – Tied	First Community Arena (2,482); Edwardsville, IL
November 14, 2025*; 6:30 PM, ESPN+		at Drake	W 61–59	3–1	20 – Malith	13 – Thompson	8 – Campion	The Knapp Center (3,234); Des Moines, IA
November 17, 2025*; 7:00 PM, B1G Network		at No. 23 Wisconsin	L 69–94	3–2	12 – Pickett	7 – Thompson	3 – Pickett	Kohl Center (13,797); Madison, WI
November 21, 2025*; 5:00 PM, MW Network		at Air Force; Air Force Classic	L 63–77	3–3	17 – Malith	7 – Thompson	3 – Hall	Clune Arena (1,305); Air Force Academy, CO
November 23, 2025*; 12:00 PM, MW Network		vs. Alabama State; Air Force Classic	W 83–68	4–3	15 – Campion	8 – Tied	5 – Campion	Clune Arena (1,099); Air Force Academy, CO
November 28, 2025*; 3:00 PM, ESPN+		Missouri Baptist	W 92–55	5–3	14 – Malith	7 – Sakenis	4 – Campion	First Community Arena (1,487); Edwardsville, IL
December 2, 2025*; 6:00 PM, ESPN+		at North Florida	W 72–63	6–3	31 – Malith	10 – Malith	5 – Campion	UNF Arena (1,166); Jacksonville, FL
December 6, 2025*; 1:00 PM, ESPN+		Western Michigan	L 73–83	6–4	20 – Malith	5 – Thompson	8 – Campion	First Community Arena (1,497); Edwardsville, IL
December 14, 2025*; 1:00 PM, ESPN+		Eureka	W 97–54	7–4	15 – Pickett	8 – Malith	5 – Robinson	First Community Arena (1,004); Edwardsville, IL
Conference Season
December 18, 2025; 5:30 PM, ESPN+		at Eastern Illinois	L 72–76 ^{OT}	7–5 (0–1)	23 – Malith	5 – Tied	10 – Campion	Groniger Arena (451); Charleston, IL
December 22, 2025; 3:30 PM, ESPN+		at Western Illinois	W 66–61	8–5 (1–1)	24 – Malith	6 – Malith	5 – Campion	Western Hall (628); Macomb, IL
January 1, 2026; 3:30 PM, ESPN+		Southern Indiana	W 59–55	9–5 (2–1)	12 – Malith	8 – Thomas -	2 – Malith	First Community Arena (1,849); Edwardsville, IL
January 3, 2026; 3:30 PM, ESPN+		Morehead State	L 72–73	9–6 (2–2)	15 – Baker	5 – Baker	5 – Hall	First Community Arena (1,869); Edwardsville, IL
January 6, 2026; 7:30 PM, ESPN+		Lindenwood	W 66–62	10–6 (3–2)	20 – Baker	9 – Baker	7 – Campion	First Community Arena (1,477); Edwardsville, IL
January 8, 2026; 7:30 PM, ESPN+		Little Rock	L 70–73	10–7 (3–3)	15 – Thomas	8 – Thomas	8 – Campion	First Community Arena (1,102); Edwardsville, IL
January 15, 2026; 7:30 PM, ESPN+		at UT Martin	L 59–65	10–8 (3–4)	15 – Baker	8 – Sakenis	4 – Hall	Kathleen and Tom Elam Center (1,753); Martin, TN
January 17, 2026; 3:45 PM, ESPN+		at Southeast Missouri State	W 68–55	11–8 (4–4)	19 – Sakenis	8 – Sakenis	6 – Campion	Show Me Center (3,020); Cape Girardeau, MO
January 22, 2026; 7:30 PM, ESPNU		Tennessee State	W 74–66	12–8 (5–4)	20 – Thomas	6 – Tied	10 – Campion	First Community Arena (2,375); Edwardsville, IL
January 24, 2026; 1:30 PM, ESPN+		Tennessee Tech	W 62–58	13–8 (6–4)	16 – Sakenis	12 – Sakenis	6 – Campion	First Community Arena (1,623); Edwardsville, IL
January 29, 2026; 6:30 PM, ESPN+		at Morehead State	L 65–67	13–9 (6–5)	24 – King	7 – Thomas	5 – Campion	Ellis T. Johnson Arena (1,065); Morehead, KY
January 31, 2026; 7:30 PM, ESPN+		at Southern Indiana	W 58–46	14–9 (7–5)	15 – Campion	8 – Baker	2 – Hall	Liberty Arena (2,057); Evansville, IN
February 3, 2026; 7:30 PM, ESPN+		at Lindenwood	W 78–72	15–9 (8–5)	22 – King	13 – Sakenis	7 – Campion	The Hyland Arena (1,110); St. Charles, MO
February 7, 2026; 3:00 PM, ESPN+		at Little Rock	W 71–61	16–9 (9–5)	19 – King	9 – Campion	8 – Campion	Jack Stephens Center (1,966); Little Rock, AR
February 12, 2026; 7:30 PM, ESPN+		Southeast Missouri State	W 74–56	17–9 (10–5)	15 – Tied	16 – Sakenis	8 – Campion	First Community Arena (2,323); Edwardsville, IL
February 14, 2026; 3:30 PM, ESPN+		UT Martin	L 76–81	17–10 (10–6)	21 – King	9 – Sakenis	3 – Campion	First Community Arena (1,927); Edwardsville, IL
February 19, 2026; 7:30 PM, ESPN+		at Tennessee Tech	L 52–62	17–11 (10–7)	13 – Baker	9 – Thomas	5 – Campion	Eblen Center (1,230); Cookeville, TN
February 21, 2026; 1:00 PM, ESPN+		at Tennessee State	L 53–80	17–12 (10–8)	17 – Baker	4 – Baker	3 – Campion	Gentry Center (876); Nashville, TN
February 26, 2026; 7:30 PM, ESPN+		Western Illinois	W 67–47	18–12 (11–8)	18 – King	8 – Thomas	7 – Campion	First Community Arena (1,777); Edwardsville, IL
February 28, 2026; 3:30 PM, ESPN+		Eastern Illinois; Senior Day	W 77–50	19–12 (12–8)	16 – Sakenis	7 – King	9 – Campion	First Community Arena; Edwardsville, IL
Conference Tournament
March 4, 2026; 6:00 PM, ESPN+	(5)	vs. (8) Eastern Illinois; First round	L 71–77	19–13	19 – King	12 – Sakenis	8 – Campion	Ford Center (929); Evansville, IN
*Non-conference game. ^{#}Rankings from AP Poll. (#) Tournament seedings in parentheses. All times are in Central Time Zone.
