= 2025–26 Southern Indiana Screaming Eagles men's basketball team =

American college basketball season

2025–26 Southern Indiana Screaming Eagles men's basketball
- Conference: Ohio Valley Conference
- Record: 7–23 (4–16 OVC)
- Head coach: Stan Gouard (6th season)
- Assistant coaches: John Spruance; Jon Aldridge; Kevin Missouri
- Home arena: Liberty Arena

2025–26 Ohio Valley Conference men's basketball standings
	Conf.				Overall
Team	W		L	PCT	W		L	PCT
Tennessee State †	15	–	5	.750	23	–	10	.697
Morehead State	15	–	5	.750	20	–	13	.606
Southeast Missouri State	14	–	6	.700	20	–	13	.606
UT Martin	13	–	7	.650	22	–	11	.667
SIU Edwardsville	12	–	8	.600	19	–	13	.594
Lindenwood	11	–	9	.550	18	–	15	.545
Little Rock	9	–	11	.450	12	–	20	.375
Eastern Illinois	8	–	12	.400	13	–	20	.394
Tennessee Tech	8	–	12	.400	13	–	18	.419
Southern Indiana	4	–	16	.200	7	–	23	.233
Western Illinois	1	–	19	.050	5	–	26	.161
† 2026 OVC tournament winner

The 2025–26 Southern Indiana Screaming Eagles men's basketball team represented the University of Southern Indiana during the 2025–26 NCAA Division I men's basketball season. The Screaming Eagles, led by sixth-year head coach Stan Gouard, played their home games at the Liberty Arena in Evansville, Indiana, as members of the Ohio Valley Conference. They finished the season 7–23, 4–16 in OVC play to finish in 10th place. They failed to qualify for the OVC tournament.

This season marked Southern Indiana's first season as a full NCAA Division I member, due to a new NCAA ruling that shortened the transition period from four years to three. As a result, they were eligible for postseason play.

== Previous season ==
The Screaming Eagles finished the 2024–25 season 10–20, 5–15 in OVC play, to finish in last place. They failed to qualify for the OVC tournament, as only the top eight teams were eligible to participate.

== Preseason ==
On October 14, 2025, the OVC released their preseason polls. Southern Indiana was picked to finish ninth in the conference, while receiving two first-place votes.

=== Preseason rankings ===
ASUN Preseason Coaches Poll
Place	Team	Votes
1	Little Rock	188 (12)
2	Southeast Missouri State	177 (6)
3	SIU Edwardsville	163 (1)
4	Tennessee State	135 (1)
T-5	Lindenwood	100
T-5	Morehead State	100
7	Tennessee Tech	80
8	UT Martin	79
9	Southern Indiana	67 (2)
10	Eastern Illinois	63
11	Western Illinois	57
(#) first-place votes

=== Players to Watch ===
Each OVC team selected two "Players to Watch" for their team.

Players to Watch
Player	Position	Year
Trey Thomas	Guard	Senior
Ismail Habib	Guard	Junior

== Roster ==
2025–26 Southern Indiana Screaming Eagles men's basketball team
Players
Coaches

Pos.	#	Name	Height	Weight	Year	Previous school	Hometown
G	0	Kaden Brown	6 ft 1 in (1.85 m)	175 lb (79 kg)	Jr	Grand Valley State	Grand Rapids, Michigan
G	1	Trey Thomas	6 ft 2 in (1.88 m)	190 lb (86 kg)	Sr	Bethune–Cookman	Upper Marlboro, Maryland
G/F	2	Steven Clay	6 ft 4 in (1.93 m)	190 lb (86 kg)	Sr	Morehead State	Milwaukee, Wisconsin
F	3	Tolu Samuels	6 ft 8 in (2.03 m)	205 lb (93 kg)	Jr	Triton College	Chicago, Illinois
G	4	Braxton Jones	6 ft 0 in (1.83 m)	175 lb (79 kg)	Sr	Garden City Community College	Monroe, New Jersey
F	5	Ola Ajiboye	6 ft 8 in (2.03 m)	205 lb (93 kg)	Sr	Tennessee Tech	Chicago, Illinois
F	6	Ben Ezeagu	6 ft 7 in (2.01 m)	215 lb (98 kg)	Sr	Appalachian State	Brampton, Ontario
G	8	Cardell Bailey	6 ft 6 in (1.98 m)	195 lb (88 kg)	Sr	Maryland Eastern Shore	Detroit, Michigan
G	11	Sheridan Sharp	6 ft 3 in (1.91 m)	175 lb (79 kg)	Jr	Southern Illinois	Indianapolis, Indiana
G	12	Alem Fejzic	6 ft 3 in (1.91 m)	190 lb (86 kg)	So	Frank Phillips College	Sarajevo, Bosnia and Herzegovina
F	13	Devin Curtis	6 ft 11 in (2.11 m)	220 lb (100 kg)	Jr	California	Milwaukee, Wisconsin
G/F	15	Amaree Brown	6 ft 5 in (1.96 m)	210 lb (95 kg)	Jr	Oklahoma Panhandle State	Chicago, Illinois
G	21	Ismail Habib	6 ft 1 in (1.85 m)	180 lb (82 kg)	Sr	Portland State	Chicago, Illinois
G	22	Josiah Dunham	6 ft 0 in (1.83 m)	180 lb (82 kg)	So	Evansville Christian School	Evansville, Indiana
G/F	33	Cayden Gehlhausen	6 ft 8 in (2.03 m)	195 lb (88 kg)	So	North High School	Evansville, Indiana

Head coach

- Stan Gouard (Southern Indiana)

Assistant coach(es)

- John Spruance (Hope)
- Jon Aldridge (Indianapolis)
- Kevin Missouri (Texas Southern)

Legend

- (C) Team captain
- (S) Suspended
- (I) Ineligible
- (W) Walk-on
- Injured
- Current redshirt

Roster
Last update: December 10, 2025

== Schedule and results ==
Date time, TV	Rank^{#}	Opponent^{#}	Result	Record	Site (attendance) city, state
Non-conference regular season
November 5, 2025*; 6:00 pm, ESPN+		at Butler	L 58–88	0–1	Hinkle Fieldhouse (6,855); Indianapolis, IN
November 7, 2025*; 7:30 pm, ESPN+		VMI	L 74–78	0–2	Liberty Arena (1,669); Evansville, IN
November 12, 2025*; 7:00 pm, SLN		at South Dakota	L 74–89	0–3	Sanford Coyote Sports Center (1,263); Vermillion, SD
November 16, 2025*; 3:00 pm, ESPN+		Loras	W 91–74	1–3	Liberty Arena (734); Evansville, IN
November 20, 2025*; 11:30 am, BallerTV		vs. Incarnate Word; Boardwalk Battle semifinals	L 81–87	1–4	Ocean Center (475); Daytona Beach, FL
November 22, 2025*; 4:00 pm, BallerTV		vs. UIC; Boardwalk Battle 3rd-place game	L 73–84	1–5	Ocean Center (516); Daytona Beach, FL
November 26, 2025*; 2:00 pm, ESPN+		at Valparaiso	W 64–56	2–5	Athletics–Recreation Center (1,296); Valparaiso, IN
November 29, 2025*; 3:00 pm, ESPN+		Kentucky State	W 93–56	3–5	Liberty Arena (983); Evansville, IN
December 3, 2025*; 6:00 pm, ESPN+		at Western Michigan	L 74–88	3–6	University Arena (1,029); Kalamazoo, MI
December 7, 2025*; 12:00 pm, ESPN+		at Indiana State	L 55–77	3–7	Hulman Center (4,198); Terre Haute, IN
December 15, 2025*; 7:00 pm, ESPN+		East–West	Cancelled due to transportation issues for visiting team		Liberty Arena; Evansville, IN
OVC regular season
December 18, 2025; 7:30 pm, ESPN+		Little Rock	L 62–77	3–8 (0–1)	Liberty Arena (928); Evansville, IN
December 20, 2025; 3:30 pm, ESPN+		Morehead State	L 60–64 ^{OT}	3–9 (0–2)	Liberty Arena (1,245); Evansville, IN
January 1, 2026; 3:30 pm, ESPN+		at SIU Edwardsville	L 55–59	3–10 (0–3)	First Community Arena (1,849); Edwardsville, IL
January 3, 2026; 3:30 pm, ESPN+		at Lindenwood	L 80–83	3–11 (0–4)	Robert F. Hyland Arena (913); St. Charles, MO
January 8, 2026; 7:30 pm, ESPN+		Southeast Missouri State	L 76–84	3–12 (0–5)	Liberty Arena (1,069); Evansville, IN
January 10, 2026; 7:30 pm, ESPN+		UT Martin	L 56–73	3–13 (0–6)	Liberty Arena (1,604); Evansville, IN
January 15, 2026; 7:30 pm, ESPN+		at Tennessee Tech	W 71–54	4–13 (1–6)	Hooper Eblen Center (1,250); Cookeville, TN
January 17, 2026; 3:30 pm, ESPN+		at Tennessee State	L 67–73	4–14 (1–7)	Gentry Center (439); Nashville, TN
January 22, 2026; 7:30 pm, ESPN+		Eastern Illinois	L 51–59 ^{OT}	4–15 (1–8)	Liberty Arena (1,369); Evansville, IN
January 24, 2026; 3:30 pm, ESPN+		Western Illinois	W 96–64	5–15 (2–8)	Liberty Arena (942); Evansville, IN
January 29, 2026; 7:30 pm, ESPN+		Lindenwood	L 60–73	5–16 (2–9)	Liberty Arena (1,081); Evansville, IN
January 31, 2026; 7:30 pm, ESPN+		SIU Edwardsville	L 46–58	5–17 (2–10)	Liberty Arena (2,057); Evansville, IN
February 5, 2026; 7:30 pm, ESPN+		at UT Martin	L 54–76	5–18 (2–11)	Skyhawk Arena (1,240); Martin, TN
February 7, 2026; 3:45 pm, ESPN+		at Southeast Missouri State	L 65–90	5–19 (2–12)	Show Me Center (1,978); Cape Girardeau, MO
February 12, 2026; 7:30 pm, ESPN+		Tennessee State	L 71–73	5–20 (2–13)	Liberty Arena (969); Evansville, IN
February 14, 2026; 3:30 pm, ESPN+		Tennessee Tech	L 74–82	5–21 (2–14)	Liberty Arena (1,769); Evansville, IN
February 19, 2026; 7:30 pm, ESPN+		at Western Illinois	W 77–70	6–21 (3–14)	Western Hall (505); Macomb, IL
February 21, 2026; 3:30 pm, ESPN+		at Eastern Illinois	W 70–68	7–21 (4–14)	Groniger Arena (1,836); Charleston, IL
February 24, 2026; 6:30 pm, ESPN+		at Morehead State	L 63–64	7–22 (4–15)	Ellis Johnson Arena (1,567); Morehead, KY
February 28, 2026; 3:30 pm, ESPN+		at Little Rock	L 70–89	7–23 (4–16)	Jack Stephens Center; Little Rock, AR
*Non-conference game. ^{#}Rankings from AP Poll. (#) Tournament seedings in parentheses. All times are in Central.
