= 2025–26 Southeast Missouri State Redhawks men's basketball team =

American college basketball season

2025–26 Southeast Missouri State Redhawks men's basketball
- Conference: Ohio Valley Conference
- Record: 20–13 (14–6 OVC)
- Head coach: Brad Korn (6th season)
- Associate head coach: J.R. Reynolds
- Assistant coaches: LaDon Champagnie; DJ Byrd; Ryan Strohm
- Home arena: Show Me Center

2025–26 Ohio Valley Conference men's basketball standings
	Conf.				Overall
Team	W		L	PCT	W		L	PCT
Tennessee State †	15	–	5	.750	23	–	9	.719
Morehead State	15	–	5	.750	20	–	13	.606
Southeast Missouri State	14	–	6	.700	20	–	13	.606
UT Martin	13	–	7	.650	22	–	11	.667
SIU Edwardsville	12	–	8	.600	19	–	13	.594
Lindenwood	11	–	9	.550	18	–	15	.545
Little Rock	9	–	11	.450	12	–	20	.375
Eastern Illinois	8	–	12	.400	13	–	20	.394
Tennessee Tech	8	–	12	.400	13	–	18	.419
Southern Indiana	4	–	16	.200	7	–	23	.233
Western Illinois	1	–	19	.050	5	–	26	.161
† 2026 OVC tournament winner As of March 7, 2026

The 2025–26 Southeast Missouri State Redhawks men's basketball team represented Southeast Missouri State University during the 2025–26 NCAA Division I men's basketball season. The Redhawks, led by sixth-year head coach Brad Korn, played their home games at the Show Me Center in Cape Girardeau, Missouri as members of the Ohio Valley Conference.

== Previous season ==
The Redhawks finished the 2024–25 season 21–12, 15–5 in OVC play, to finish as OVC regular season champions. They defeated Little Rock, before falling to SIU Edwardsville in the OVC tournament championship game.

== Preseason ==
On October 14, 2025, the OVC released their preseason polls. Southeast Missouri State was picked to finish second in the conference, while receiving six first-place votes.

=== Preseason rankings ===
ASUN Preseason Coaches Poll
Place	Team	Votes
1	Little Rock	188 (12)
2	Southeast Missouri State	177 (6)
3	SIU Edwardsville	163 (1)
4	Tennessee State	135 (1)
T-5	Lindenwood	100
T-5	Morehead State	100
7	Tennessee Tech	80
8	UT Martin	79
9	Southern Indiana	67 (2)
10	Eastern Illinois	63
11	Western Illinois	57
(#) first-place votes

=== Players to Watch ===
Each OVC team selected two "Players to Watch" for their team.

Players to Watch
Player	Position	Year
BJ Ward	Guard	Junior
Braxton Stacker	Guard	Senior

== Roster ==
2025–26 Southeast Missouri State Redhawks men's basketball team
Players
Coaches

Pos.	#	Name	Height	Weight	Year	Previous school	Hometown
G	1	PJ Farmer	6 ft 0 in (1.83 m)	180 lb (82 kg)	Fr	Sikeston High School	Charleston, Missouri
G	2	BJ Ward	6 ft 0 in (1.83 m)	195 lb (88 kg)	Jr	Chaminade College Preparatory School	St. Louis, Missouri
F	3	Trace Sadler	7 ft 0 in (2.13 m)	220 lb (100 kg)	Fr	Sikeston High School	Sikeston, Missouri
G	4	Troy Cole Jr.	6 ft 4 in (1.93 m)	200 lb (91 kg)	Sr	Highland Community College	Donaldsonville, Louisiana
G	7	Landren Blocker	6 ft 5 in (1.96 m)	210 lb (95 kg)	So	Louisiana Tech	Little Rock, Arkansas
G	9	Blaize Sagna	6 ft 3 in (1.91 m)	190 lb (86 kg)	GS	Stetson	London, England
G	10	Luke Almodovar	6 ft 3 in (1.91 m)	190 lb (86 kg)	Jr	Saint Francis (IN)	Noblesville, Indiana
F	15	Brendan Terry	6 ft 7 in (2.01 m)	220 lb (100 kg)	Sr	Pensacola State College	Santa Monica, California
C	18	David Idada	7 ft 0 in (2.13 m)	270 lb (122 kg)	Sr	Golden State Prep	Barendrecht, Netherlands
F	22	Saxton Hoepker	6 ft 8 in (2.03 m)	215 lb (98 kg)	Sr	Southwestern Illinois College	Nashville, Illinois
G	25	Jay Reynolds	6 ft 3 in (1.91 m)	195 lb (88 kg)	RS Fr	Central High School	Cape Girardeau, Missouri
F	30	Elliot Lowndes	7 ft 0 in (2.13 m)	200 lb (91 kg)	Sr	John A. Logan College	Cobden, Illinois
G	44	Braxton Stacker	6 ft 5 in (1.96 m)	205 lb (93 kg)	Sr	Murray State	Fairview Heights, Illinois
G	55	Marqueas Bell	6 ft 3 in (1.91 m)	185 lb (84 kg)	Jr	Park Hill High School	Kansas City, Missouri

Head coach

- Brad Korn (Southern Illinois)

Assistant coach(es)

- J.R. Reynolds (Eastern Illinois)
- LaDon Champagnie (Missouri Baptist)
- DJ Byrd (Purdue)
- Ryan Strohm (Greenville)

Legend

- (C) Team captain
- (S) Suspended
- (I) Ineligible
- (W) Walk-on
- Injured
- Current redshirt

Roster
Last update: December 8, 2025

== Schedule and results ==
Date time, TV	Rank^{#}	Opponent^{#}	Result	Record	Site (attendance) city, state
Non-conference regular season
November 3, 2025*; 7:00 pm, ESPN+		at Saint Louis	L 67–92	0–1	Chaifetz Arena (5,364); St. Louis, MO
November 7, 2025*; 7:00 pm, SECN+		at Missouri	L 84–89	0–2	Mizzou Arena (11,314); Columbia, MO
November 12, 2025*; 6:30 pm, ESPN+		Webster	W 87–41	1–2	Show Me Center (1,375); Cape Girardeau, MO
November 15, 2025*; 2:00 pm, ESPN+		St. Thomas	L 72–84	1–3	Show Me Center (1,750); Cape Girardeau, MO
November 18, 2025*; 7:30 pm, BTN		at Iowa	L 70–99	1–4	Carver–Hawkeye Arena (9,302); Iowa City, IA
November 25, 2025*; 7:00 pm		vs. Cal Poly; Northern Arizona MTE	W 84–68	2–4	Rolle Activity Center (86); Flagstaff, AZ
November 26, 2025*; 7:00 pm, ESPN+		at Northern Arizona; Northern Arizona MTE	L 72–79	2–5	Rolle Activity Center (231); Flagstaff, AZ
November 29, 2025*; 2:00 pm, ESPN+		Lipscomb	L 77–88	2–6	Show Me Center (698); Cape Girardeau, MO
December 2, 2025*; 6:30 pm, ESPN+		Saint Mary-of-the-Woods	W 88–57	3–6	Show Me Center (1,345); Cape Girardeau, MO
December 6, 2025*; 3:30 pm, ESPN+		at Chattanooga	W 74–70	4–6	McKenzie Arena (3,055); Chattanooga, TN
December 14, 2025*; 2:00 pm, ESPN+		Saint Xavier	W 88–65	5–6	Show Me Center (1,482); Cape Girardeau, MO
OVC regular season
December 18, 2025; 7:30 pm, ESPN+		at Tennessee Tech	L 74–85	5–7 (0–1)	Hooper Eblen Center (751); Cookeville, TN
December 20, 2025; 3:30 pm, ESPN+		at Tennessee State	W 91–82	6–7 (1–1)	Gentry Center (327); Nashville, TN
January 1, 2026; 7:30 pm, ESPN+		Eastern Illinois	W 68–59	7–7 (2–1)	Show Me Center (2,132); Cape Girardeau, MO
January 3, 2026; 3:45 pm, ESPN+		Western Illinois	W 73–50	8–7 (3–1)	Show Me Center (1,846); Cape Girardeau, MO
January 8, 2026; 7:30 pm, ESPN+		at Southern Indiana	W 84–76	9–7 (4–1)	Liberty Arena (1,069); Evansville, IN
January 10, 2026; 2:30 pm, ESPN+		at Morehead State	L 69–71	9–8 (4–2)	Ellis Johnson Arena (1,117); Morehead, KY
January 15, 2026; 8:00 pm, ESPNU		Lindenwood	L 76–88	9–9 (4–3)	Show Me Center (3,892); Cape Girardeau, MO
January 17, 2026; 3:45 pm, ESPN+		SIU Edwardsville	L 55–68	9–10 (4–4)	Show Me Center (3,020); Cape Girardeau, MO
January 20, 2026; 7:30 pm, ESPN+		UT Martin	W 66–50	10–10 (5–4)	Show Me Center (1,924); Cape Girardeau, MO
January 22, 2026; 7:30 pm, ESPN+		Little Rock	W 70–65	11–10 (6–4)	Show Me Center (1,463); Cape Girardeau, MO
January 29, 2026; 7:30 pm, ESPN+		at Western Illinois	W 78–74	12–10 (7–4)	Western Hall (527); Macomb, IL
January 31, 2026; 3:30 pm, ESPN+		at Eastern Illinois	W 77–59	13–10 (8–4)	Groniger Arena (1,337); Charleston, IL
February 5, 2026; 7:30 pm, ESPN+		Morehead State	W 82–70	14–10 (9–4)	Show Me Center (1,930); Cape Girardeau, MO
February 7, 2026; 3:45 pm, ESPN+		Southern Indiana	W 90–65	15–10 (10–4)	Show Me Center (1,978); Cape Girardeau, MO
February 12, 2026; 7:30 pm, ESPN+		at SIU Edwardsville	L 56–74	15–11 (10–5)	First Community Arena (2,323); Edwardsville, IL
February 14, 2026; 3:30 pm, ESPN+		at Lindenwood	W 73–61	16–11 (11–5)	Robert F. Hyland Arena (2,001); St. Charles, MO
February 17, 2026; 7:30 pm, ESPN+		at UT Martin	W 56–53 ^{OT}	17–11 (12–5)	Skyhawk Arena (1,322); Martin, TN
February 21, 2026; 3:00 pm, ESPN+		at Little Rock	W 70–65	18–11 (13–5)	Jack Stephens Center (3,270); Little Rock, AR
February 26, 2026; 7:30 pm, ESPN+		Tennessee State	L 71–79	18–12 (13–6)	Show Me Center (3,947); Cape Girardeau, MO
February 28, 2026; 4:00 pm, ESPN+		Tennessee Tech	W 89–73	19–12 (14–6)	Show Me Center (3,200); Cape Girardeau, MO
OVC tournament
March 5, 2026; 8:30 p.m., ESPN+	(3)	vs. (6) Lindenwood; Quarterfinals	W 68–66	20–12	Ford Center (1,101); Evansville, IN
March 6, 2026; 9:30 p.m., ESPNU	(3)	vs. (2) Morehead State; Semifinals	L 61–66	20–13	Ford Center; Evansville, IN
*Non-conference game. ^{#}Rankings from AP Poll. (#) Tournament seedings in parentheses. All times are in Central.
