= 2025–26 Eastern Illinois Panthers men's basketball team =

American college basketball season

2025–26 Eastern Illinois Panthers men's basketball
- Conference: Ohio Valley Conference
- Record: 13–20 (8–12 OVC)
- Head coach: Marty Simmons (5th season)
- Assistant coaches: Rich McBride; Nate Michael; Henoc Bienne; Bob Lockart
- Home arena: Groniger Arena

2025–26 Ohio Valley Conference men's basketball standings
	Conf.				Overall
Team	W		L	PCT	W		L	PCT
Tennessee State †	15	–	5	.750	23	–	9	.719
Morehead State	15	–	5	.750	20	–	13	.606
Southeast Missouri State	14	–	6	.700	20	–	13	.606
UT Martin	13	–	7	.650	22	–	11	.667
SIU Edwardsville	12	–	8	.600	19	–	13	.594
Lindenwood	11	–	9	.550	18	–	15	.545
Little Rock	9	–	11	.450	12	–	20	.375
Eastern Illinois	8	–	12	.400	13	–	20	.394
Tennessee Tech	8	–	12	.400	13	–	18	.419
Southern Indiana	4	–	16	.200	7	–	23	.233
Western Illinois	1	–	19	.050	5	–	26	.161
† 2026 OVC tournament winner As of March 7, 2026

The 2025–26 Eastern Illinois Panthers men's basketball team represented Eastern Illinois University during the 2025–26 NCAA Division I men's basketball season. The Panthers, led by fifth-year head coach Marty Simmons, played their home games at Groniger Arena in Charleston, Illinois as members of the Ohio Valley Conference. They finished the season 13–20, 8–12 in OVC play to finish in eighth place. They upset No. 5-seeded SIU Edwardsville in the first round of the OVC tournament before losing to UT Martin in the quarterfinals.

== Previous season ==
The Panthers finished the 2024–25 season 12–19, 8–12 in OVC play, to finish in ninth place. They failed to qualify for the OVC tournament, as onlt the top eight teams make it.

== Preseason ==
On October 14, 2025, the OVC released their preseason polls. Eastern Illinois was picked to finish tenth in the conference.

=== Preseason rankings ===
ASUN Preseason Coaches Poll
Place	Team	Votes
1	Little Rock	188 (12)
2	Southeast Missouri State	177 (6)
3	SIU Edwardsville	163 (1)
4	Tennessee State	135 (1)
T-5	Lindenwood	100
T-5	Morehead State	100
7	Tennessee Tech	80
8	UT Martin	79
9	Southern Indiana	67 (2)
10	Eastern Illinois	63
11	Western Illinois	57
(#) first-place votes

=== Players to Watch ===
Each OVC team selected two "Players to Watch" for their team.

Players to Watch
Player	Position	Year
Kooper Jacobi	Forward	Graduate Student
Zion Fruster	Guard	Senior

== Roster ==
2025–26 Eastern Illinois Panthers men's basketball team
Players
Coaches

Pos.	#	Name	Height	Weight	Year	Previous school	Hometown
G	1	Markus Blackwell	6 ft 2 in (1.88 m)	180 lb (82 kg)	Fr	Warren Lincoln High School	Detroit, Michigan
G	2	JT Elder	6 ft 7 in (2.01 m)	200 lb (91 kg)	RS Jr	Arizona Western College	Tucson, Arizona
G	3	Meechie White	6 ft 1 in (1.85 m)	175 lb (79 kg)	Jr	Three Rivers College	Louisville, Kentucky
G	4	Andre Washington	5 ft 11 in (1.8 m)	180 lb (82 kg)	GS	LIU	Staten Island, New York
G	5	Zion Fruster	6 ft 2 in (1.88 m)	170 lb (77 kg)	Sr	UVA Wise	Douglasville, Georgia
G	6	Kyle Layton	6 ft 0 in (1.83 m)	175 lb (79 kg)	Jr	Tennessee Tech	McKinney, Texas
F	7	Prince Johnson	6 ft 8 in (2.03 m)	215 lb (98 kg)	Jr	Gulf Coast State College	Bennettsville, South Carolina
G	10	Preston Turner	6 ft 6 in (1.98 m)	185 lb (84 kg)	RS Jr	Mineral Area College	Ellsinore, Missouri
G	11	Malik Olafioye	6 ft 2 in (1.88 m)	190 lb (86 kg)	RS So	Kansas City	Ecorse, Michigan
F	13	Nazareth Fisher (5th)	6 ft 10 in (2.08 m)	220 lb (100 kg)	Sr	Point Park	Washington, D.C.
F	15	Andrew Austin	6 ft 7 in (2.01 m)	220 lb (100 kg)	RS So	Des Moines Area Community College	Rock Rapids, Iowa
G	23	Shane Sims	6 ft 4 in (1.93 m)	200 lb (91 kg)	Fr	Harrison High School	Evansville, Indiana
F	24	Terry McMorris	6 ft 7 in (2.01 m)	185 lb (84 kg)	So	Link Year Prep	Oklahoma City, Oklahoma
F	40	Kooper Jacobi	6 ft 7 in (2.01 m)	200 lb (91 kg)	GS	Toledo	Sellersburg, Indiana

Head coach

- Marty Simmons (Evansville)

Assistant coach(es)

- Rich McBride (Illinois)
- Nate Michael (McKendree)
- Henoc Bienne (Mercy)
- Bob Lockart (Millikin)

Legend

- (C) Team captain
- (S) Suspended
- (I) Ineligible
- (W) Walk-on
- (5th) Fifth-year senior
- Injured
- Current redshirt

Roster
Last update: December 11, 2025

== Schedule and results ==
Date time, TV	Rank^{#}	Opponent^{#}	Result	Record	Site (attendance) city, state
Regular season
November 4, 2025*; 7:00 pm, ESPN+		at Valparaiso; BBN United Tipoff Classic	L 63–66	0–1	Athletics–Recreation Center (1,095); Valparaiso, IN
November 7, 2025*; 7:00 pm, ESPN+		Nicholls; BBN United Tipoff Classic	W 65–57	1–1	Groniger Arena (1,024); Charleston, IL
November 11, 2025*; 6:30 pm, ACCNX		at Notre Dame	L 58–78	1–2	Joyce Center (3,618); Notre Dame, IN
November 14, 2025*; 6:00 pm, SECN+		at No. 9 Kentucky; BBN United Tipoff Classic	L 53–99	1–3	Rupp Arena (20,000); Lexington, KY
November 19, 2025*; 7:00 pm, ESPN+		Tiffin	W 62–50	2–3	Groniger Arena (1,016); Charleston, IL
November 25, 2025*; 6:30 pm, ESPN+		at Central Arkansas	L 60–81	2–4	Farris Center (688); Conway, AR
November 28, 2025*; 11:00 am, BTN		at No. 1 Purdue	L 62–109	2–5	Mackey Arena (14,876); West Lafayette, IN
December 6, 2025; 7:00 pm, ESPN+		Lindenwood	L 74–82	2–6 (0–1)	Groniger Arena (920); Charleston, IL
December 10, 2025*; 7:00 pm, ESPN+		Eastern Kentucky	L 59–68	2–7	Groniger Arena (1,031); Charleston, IL
December 14, 2025*; 12:00 pm, ESPN+		at No. 4 Iowa State	L 53–77	2–8	Hilton Coliseum (13,876); Ames, IA
December 18, 2025; 5:30 pm, ESPN+		SIU Edwardsville	W 76–72 ^{OT}	3–8 (1–1)	Groniger Arena (869); Charleston, IL
December 22, 2025*; 2:00 pm, ESPN+		East–West	W 110–56	4–8	Groniger Arena (451); Charleston, IL
January 1, 2026; 7:30 pm, ESPN+		at Southeast Missouri State	L 59–68	4–9 (1–2)	Show Me Center (2,132); Cape Girardeau, MO
January 3, 2026; 3:30 pm, ESPN+		at UT Martin	L 61–65	4–10 (1–3)	Skyhawk Arena (1,086); Martin, TN
January 8, 2026; 7:30 pm, ESPN+		Tennessee Tech	W 71–61	5–10 (2–3)	Groniger Arena (736); Charleston, IL
January 10, 2026; 3:30 pm, ESPN+		Tennessee State	W 74–70	6–10 (3–3)	Groniger Arena (1,137); Charleston, IL
January 13, 2026; 7:30 pm, ESPN+		Western Illinois	W 57–55	7–10 (4–3)	Groniger Arena (1,324); Charleston, IL
January 15, 2026; 7:00 pm, ESPN+		at Little Rock	L 63–74	7–11 (4–4)	Jack Stephens Center (1,263); Little Rock, AR
January 18, 2026*; 2:00 pm, ESPN+		Blackburn; Rescheduled from December 1 due to inclement weather	W 105–49	8–11	Groniger Arena (753); Charleston, IL
January 22, 2026; 7:30 pm, ESPN+		at Southern Indiana	W 59–51 ^{OT}	9–11 (5–4)	Liberty Arena (1,369); Evansville, IN
January 24, 2026; 2:30 pm, ESPN+		at Morehead State	L 68–73	9–12 (5–5)	Ellis Johnson Arena (1,013); Morehead, KY
January 29, 2026; 7:30 pm, ESPN+		UT Martin	L 68–76	9–13 (5–6)	Groniger Arena (1,437); Charleston, IL
January 31, 2026; 3:30 pm, ESPN+		Southeast Missouri State	L 59–77	9–14 (5–7)	Groniger Arena (1,337); Charleston, IL
February 5, 2026; 7:30 pm, ESPN+		at Tennessee State	L 68–77	9–15 (5–8)	Gentry Center (523); Nashville, TN
February 7, 2026; 3:00 pm, ESPN+		at Tennessee Tech	W 60–54	10–15 (6–8)	Hooper Eblen Center (1,077); Cookeville, TN
February 10, 2026; 7:30 pm, ESPN+		at Western Illinois	L 70–79	10–16 (6–9)	Western Hall (273); Macomb, IL
February 14, 2026; 3:30 pm, ESPN+		Little Rock	W 78–72	11–16 (7–9)	Groniger Arena (1,214); Charleston, IL
February 19, 2026; 7:30 pm, ESPN+		Morehead State	L 70–73	11–17 (7–10)	Groniger Arena (1,818); Charleston, IL
February 21, 2026; 3:30 pm, ESPN+		Southern Indiana	L 68–70	11–18 (7–11)	Groniger Arena (1,836); Charleston, IL
February 26, 2026; 7:30 pm, ESPN+		at Lindenwood	W 71–67	12–18 (8–11)	Robert F. Hyland Arena (1,289); St. Charles, MO
February 28, 2026; 3:30 pm, ESPN+		at SIU Edwardsville	L 50–77	12–19 (8–12)	First Community Arena (2,634); Edwardsville, IL
OVC tournament
March 4, 2026; 6:00 pm, ESPN+	(8)	vs. (5) SIU Edwardsville; First round	W 77–71 ^{OT}	13–19	Ford Center (929); Evansville, IN
March 5, 2026; 6:00 pm, ESPN+	(8)	vs. (4) UT Martin; Quarterfinals	L 63–66	13–20	Ford Center; Evansville, IN
*Non-conference game. ^{#}Rankings from AP Poll. (#) Tournament seedings in parentheses. All times are in Central.
