= 2025–26 Tennessee State Tigers basketball team =

American college basketball season

2025–26 Tennessee State Tigers basketball

Ohio Valley regular season and tournament champions

NCAA tournament, First round
- Conference: Ohio Valley Conference
- Record: 23–10 (15–5 OVC)
- Head coach: Nolan Smith (1st season)
- Associate head coach: Vince Taylor
- Assistant coaches: DerMarr Johnson; Dalonte Hill; Brandon Lockridge
- Home arena: Gentry Center

2025–26 Ohio Valley Conference men's basketball standings
	Conf.				Overall
Team	W		L	PCT	W		L	PCT
Tennessee State †	15	–	5	.750	23	–	10	.697
Morehead State	15	–	5	.750	20	–	13	.606
Southeast Missouri State	14	–	6	.700	20	–	13	.606
UT Martin	13	–	7	.650	22	–	11	.667
SIU Edwardsville	12	–	8	.600	19	–	13	.594
Lindenwood	11	–	9	.550	18	–	15	.545
Little Rock	9	–	11	.450	12	–	20	.375
Eastern Illinois	8	–	12	.400	13	–	20	.394
Tennessee Tech	8	–	12	.400	13	–	18	.419
Southern Indiana	4	–	16	.200	7	–	23	.233
Western Illinois	1	–	19	.050	5	–	26	.161
† 2026 OVC tournament winner

The 2025–26 Tennessee State Tigers basketball team represented Tennessee State University in the 2025–26 NCAA Division I men's basketball season. The Tigers are led by first-year head coach Nolan Smith and played their home games at Gentry Center in Nashville, Tennessee as members of the Ohio Valley Conference (OVC). They finished the regular season 23–9, 15–5 in OVC play to earn a share of the regular season championship. As the No. 1 seed in the OVC tournament, they defeated UT Martin and Morehead State to win the tournament championship. As a result, they received the conference's automatic bid to the NCAA tournament.

== Previous season ==
The Tigers finished the 2024–25 season 17–16, 12–8 in OVC play, to finish in a tie for third place. In the OVC tournament, they were defeated by SIU Edwardsville in the semifinal round.

== Preseason ==
On October 14, 2025, the OVC released their preseason polls. Tennessee State was picked to finish fourth in the conference, while receiving a first-place vote.

=== Preseason rankings ===
ASUN Preseason Coaches Poll
Place	Team	Votes
1	Little Rock	188 (12)
2	Southeast Missouri State	177 (6)
3	SIU Edwardsville	163 (1)
4	Tennessee State	135 (1)
T-5	Lindenwood	100
T-5	Morehead State	100
7	Tennessee Tech	80
8	UT Martin	79
9	Southern Indiana	67 (2)
10	Eastern Illinois	63
11	Western Illinois	57
(#) first-place votes

=== Players to Watch ===
Each OVC team selected two "Players to Watch" for their team.

Players to Watch
Player	Position	Year
Khalil London	Guard	Redshirt Sophomore
Carlous Williams	Forward	Graduate Senior

== Roster ==
2025–26 Tennessee State Tigers men's basketball team
Players
Coaches

Pos.	#	Name	Height	Weight	Year	Previous school	Hometown
F	0	Jalen Pitre	6 ft 8 in (2.03 m)	220 lb (100 kg)	Jr	Sacramento State	Long Beach, CA
G	1	Damon Howard Jr.	6 ft 1 in (1.85 m)	160 lb (73 kg)	Fr	Pike HS	Indianapolis, IN
G	2	Travis Harper II	6 ft 6 in (1.98 m)	190 lb (86 kg)	RS Sr	Clayton State	Columbus, GA
G	3	Khalil London	6 ft 3 in (1.91 m)	185 lb (84 kg)	RS So	Charleston	Wyandanch, NY
F	4	JC Brooks	6 ft 10 in (2.08 m)	215 lb (98 kg)	So	Orangeville Prep	Calgary, Alberta, Canada
G	5	Maddux Bodenhamer	6 ft 2 in (1.88 m)	190 lb (86 kg)	So	Antioch High School	Nashville, TN
G	7	Jabrion Spikes	6 ft 2 in (1.88 m)	210 lb (95 kg)	Sr	Georgetown College	Princeton, KY
G	10	Dante Harris	6 ft 0 in (1.83 m)	170 lb (77 kg)	GS	Memphis	Washington, D.C.
F	11	Antoine Lorick III	6 ft 8 in (2.03 m)	215 lb (98 kg)	Jr	Navarro JC	Augusta, GA
F	12	Carlous Williams	6 ft 5 in (1.96 m)	225 lb (102 kg)	GS	Tulsa	Hattiesburg, MS
G	20	Jayden Jones	6 ft 4 in (1.93 m)	195 lb (88 kg)	Fr	Goodpasture Christian	Madison, TN
F	21	Jean Yvens Lafleur	6 ft 11 in (2.11 m)	267 lb (121 kg)	Jr	Southwest Tennessee CC	Mirebalais, Haiti
F	23	Kavien Jones	6 ft 7 in (2.01 m)	260 lb (118 kg)	RS Fr	Battle Ground Academy	Franklin, TN
F	24	Ogien Ayo	6 ft 9 in (2.06 m)	180 lb (82 kg)	Sr	Kentucky State	Baton Rouge, LA
G	30	Aaron Nkrumah	6 ft 6 in (1.98 m)	175 lb (79 kg)	Sr	Worcester State	Worcester, MA
F	31	Alex Garcia	6 ft 9 in (2.06 m)	185 lb (84 kg)	Jr	Walters State CC	Cleveland, OH

Head coach

- Nolan Smith (Duke)

Assistant coach(es)

- Vince Taylor (Duke)
- DerMarr Johnson (Cincinnati)
- Dalonte Hill (Bowie State)
- Brandon Lockridge (Tennessee State)

Legend

- (C) Team captain
- (S) Suspended
- (I) Ineligible
- (W) Walk-on
- Injured
- Current redshirt

Roster
Last update: December 3, 2025

== Schedule and results ==
Date time, TV	Rank^{#}	Opponent^{#}	Result	Record	Site (attendance) city, state
Regular season
November 3, 2025*; 7:00 p.m., ESPN+		Fisk	W 101–50	1–0	Gentry Center; Nashville, TN
November 8, 2025*; 7:00 p.m., ESPN+		at Belmont	L 79–87	1–1	Curb Event Center (1,721); Nashville, TN
November 11, 2025*; 7:00 p.m., ESPN+		Oakwood	W 114–76	2–1	Gentry Center (475); Nashville, TN
November 16, 2025*; 7:00 p.m., ESPN+		at Western Kentucky	L 82–95	2–2	E. A. Diddle Arena (2,845); Bowling Green, KY
November 20, 2025*; 7:00 p.m., SECN+		at Tennessee	L 60–89	2–3	Food City Center (17,313); Knoxville, TN
November 25, 2025*; 6:30 p.m., ESPN+		at UNC Asheville	W 75–73	3–3	Kimmel Arena (687); Asheville, NC
November 29, 2025*; 1:00 p.m.		vs. Tennessee Wesleyan; Coke Classic	W 98–77	4–3	McKenzie Arena (273); Chattanooga, TN
November 30, 2025*; 2:00 p.m., ESPN+		at Chattanooga; Coke Classic	W 70–64	5–3	McKenzie Arena (2,957); Chattanooga, TN
December 3, 2025*; 7:00 p.m., SWAC TV		at Alabama A&M	L 53–80	5–4	Alabama A&M Events Center (3,223); Huntsville, AL
December 13, 2025*; 8:30 p.m., ESPN+		vs. UNLV; Jack Jones Classic	W 63–60	6–4	Lee's Family Forum; Henderson, NV
December 16, 2025; 7:30 p.m., ESPN+		UT Martin	W 78–71	7–4 (1–0)	Gentry Center (307); Nashville, TN
December 20, 2025; 3:30 p.m., ESPN+		Southeast Missouri State	L 82–91	7–5 (1–1)	Gentry Center (327); Nashville, TN
December 30, 2025; 7:30 p.m., ESPN+		at Tennessee Tech	W 88–76	8–5 (2–1)	Eblen Center (1,273); Cookeville, TN
January 3, 2026; 3:00 p.m., ESPN+		at Little Rock	W 84–79	9–5 (3–1)	Jack Stephens Center (1,129); Little Rock, AR
January 8, 2026; 7:30 p.m., ESPN+		at Western Illinois	W 90–68	10–5 (4–1)	Western Hall (718); Macomb, IL
January 10, 2026; 3:30 p.m., ESPN+		at Eastern Illinois	L 70–74	10–6 (4–2)	Lantz Arena (1,137); Charleston, IL
January 15, 2026; 7:30 p.m., ESPN+		Morehead State	W 105–100 ^{OT}	11–6 (5–2)	Gentry Center (567); Nashville, TN
January 17, 2026; 3:30 p.m., ESPN+		Southern Indiana	W 73–67	12–6 (6–2)	Gentry Center (439); Nashville, TN
January 22, 2026; 7:30 p.m., ESPN+		at SIU Edwardsville	L 66–74	12–7 (6–3)	First Community Arena (2,375); Edwardsville, IL
January 24, 2026; 3:30 p.m., ESPN+		at Lindenwood	W 96–86	13–7 (7–3)	Robert F. Hyland Arena (815); St. Charles, MO
January 29, 2026; 3:30 p.m., ESPN+		Little Rock	W 70–63	14–7 (8–3)	Gentry Center (642); Nashville, TN
February 2, 2026; 7:30 p.m., ESPN+		Tennessee Tech	L 85–90	14–8 (8–4)	Gentry Center (1,153); Nashville, TN
February 5, 2026; 7:30 p.m., ESPN+		Eastern Illinois	W 77–68	15–8 (9–4)	Gentry Center (523); Nashville, TN
February 7, 2026; 3:30 p.m., ESPN+		Western Illinois	W 83–56	16–8 (10–4)	Gentry Center (327); Nashville, TN
February 12, 2026; 7:30 p.m., ESPN+		at Southern Indiana	W 73–71	17–8 (11–4)	Screaming Eagles Arena (969); Evansville, IN
February 14, 2026; 2:30 p.m., ESPN+		at Morehead State	L 86–94	17–9 (11–5)	Ellis Johnson Arena (1,786); Morehead, KY
February 19, 2026; 3:30 p.m., ESPN+		Lindenwood	W 89–80	18–9 (12–5)	Gentry Center (256); Nashville, TN
February 21, 2026; 3:30 p.m., ESPN+		SIU Edwardsville	W 80–53	19–9 (13–5)	Gentry Center (876); Nashville, TN
February 26, 2026; 7:30 p.m., ESPN+		at Southeast Missouri State	W 79–71	20–9 (14–5)	Show Me Center (3,947); Cape Girardeau, MO
February 28, 2026; 3:30 p.m., ESPN+		at UT Martin	W 67–42	21–9 (15–5)	Skyhawk Arena (2,104); Martin, TN
OVC tournament
March 6, 2026; 7:00 pm, ESPNU	(1)	vs. (4) UT Martin; Semifinal	W 68–55	22–9	Ford Center; Evansville, IN
March 7, 2026; 8:00 pm, ESPN2	(1)	vs. (2) Morehead State; Championship	W 93–67	23–9	Ford Center (1,545); Evansville, IN
NCAA tournament
March 20, 2026; 12:50 p.m., CBS	(15 MW)	vs. (2 MW) No. 6 Iowa State; First round	L 74–108	23–10	Enterprise Center (17,192); St. Louis, MO
*Non-conference game. ^{#}Rankings from AP poll. (#) Tournament seedings in parentheses. MW=Midwest. All times are in Central.
