= Dante Harris =

American basketball player (born 2001)

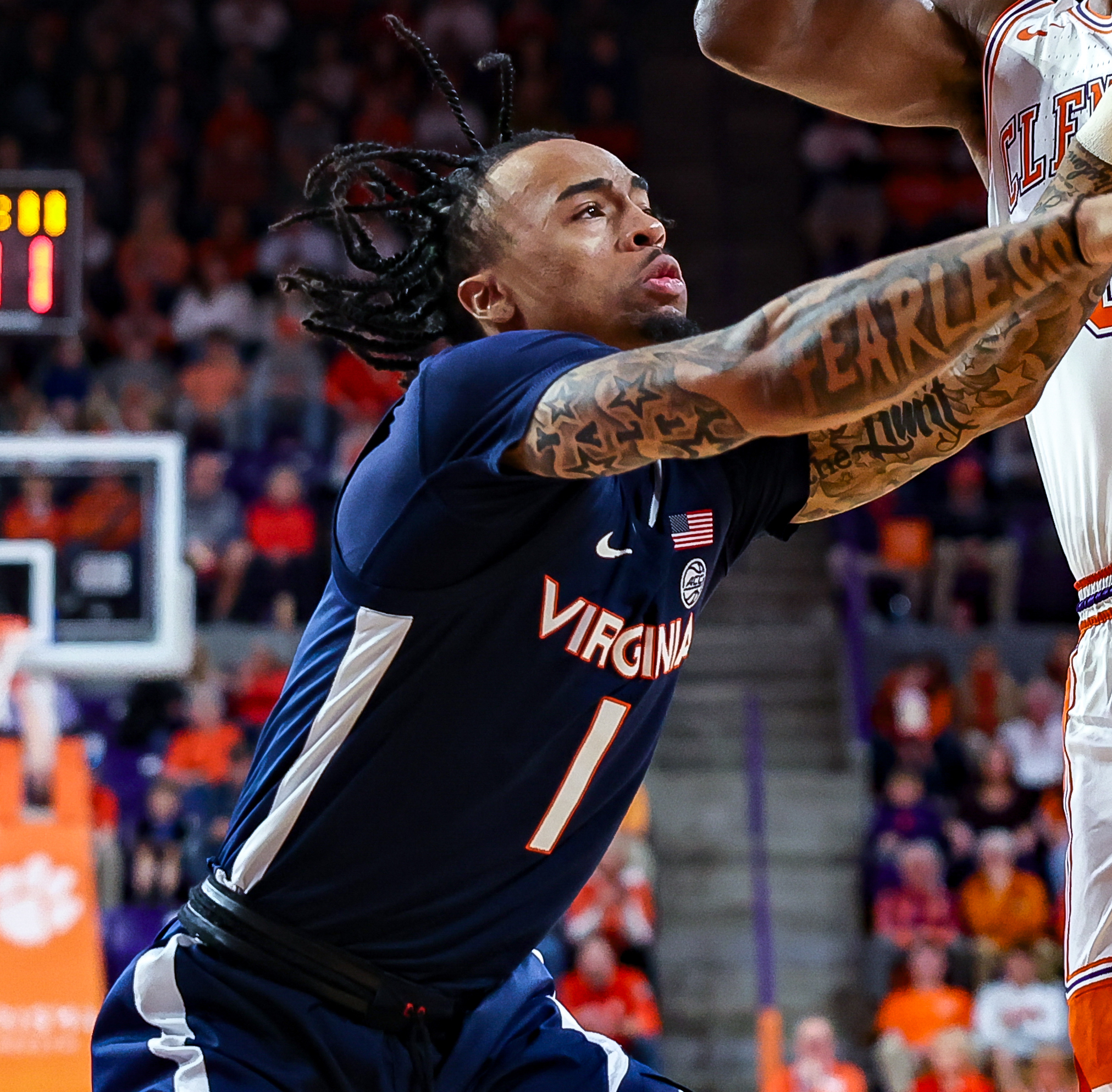
- Harris defending against Clemson on February 3, 2024.

Free agent
- Position: Point guard

Personal information
- Born: June 21, 2001 (age 25) Washington, D.C., U.S.
- Listed height: 6 ft 0 in (1.83 m)
- Listed weight: 170 lb (77 kg)

Career information
- High school: Alcoa (Alcoa, Tennessee); Lakeway Christian (Morristown, Tennessee)
- College: Georgetown (2020–2022); Virginia (2023–2024); Memphis (2024–2025); Tennessee State (2025–2026)
- NBA draft: 2026: undrafted

Career highlights
- Big East tournament MOP (2021); OVC tournament MVP (2026)

Dante Harris (born June 21, 2001) is an American basketball player. He is currently a free agent. In college Harris played for the Georgetown Hoyas, Virginia Cavaliers, Memphis Tigers, and Tennessee State Tigers.

== High school career ==
Harris played basketball for Alcoa High School in Alcoa, Tennessee. He averaged 32 points and nine assists per game and led his team to a District 4-AA title as a sophomore. He transferred to Lakeway Christian Academy in Morristown, Tennessee. As a junior, Harris averaged 30.6 points, nine assists and four steals per game. He was one of three finalists for the Division II-A Tennessee Mr. Basketball award as a senior, averaging 32.6 points, 9.3 assists and 4.2 rebounds per game. He committed to playing college basketball for Georgetown over offers from Georgia State, East Tennessee State and South Alabama, among others.

== College career ==
=== Georgetown ===
On December 13, 2020, Harris scored a freshman season-high 22 points in a 97–94 overtime win against St. John's. On March 11, he recorded 18 points and five assists in a 72–71 upset win over top-seeded Villanova at the Big East tournament quarterfinals. Harris was named most outstanding player of the tournament after leading Georgetown to the title. As a freshman, he averaged eight points, 3.4 rebounds and 3.2 assists per game. Harris averaged 11.9 points, 4.1 assists, and 3.6 rebounds per game as a sophomore. He sat out the first several games of his junior season for personal reasons before entering the transfer portal.

=== Virginia ===
On December 18, 2022, Harris transferred to the University of Virginia and redshirted the remainder of the season. He averaged 2.5 points and 1.4 assists per game as a redshirt junior. Harris initially entered the transfer portal in April 2024, but withdrew his name and announced he would return to Virginia as a walk-on.

=== Memphis ===
On December 27, 2024, Harris decided to join Memphis after entering the transfer portal in the fall and was eligible immediately. He entered the transfer portal in May 2025.

=== Tennessee State ===
He transferred to Tennessee State where he played as a graduate student. He guided Tennessee State to its first NCAA tournament berth since 1994 and won MVP of the Ohio Valley Conference tournament.

== Career statistics ==
Legend
GP	Games played	GS	Games started	MPG	Minutes per game
FG%	Field goal percentage	3P%	3-point field goal percentage	FT%	Free throw percentage
RPG	Rebounds per game	APG	Assists per game	SPG	Steals per game
BPG	Blocks per game	PPG	Points per game	**Bold**	Career high

=== College ===
Year	Team	GP	GS	MPG	FG%	3P%	FT%	RPG	APG	SPG	BPG	PPG
2020–21	Georgetown	26	21	30.3	.349	.260	**.897**	3.4	3.2	1.2	.0	8.0
2021–22	Georgetown	**29**	**29**	**32.2**	**.375**	**.275**	.747	**3.6**	**4.1**	**1.5**	**.1**	**11.9**
2022–23	Virginia	Redshirt										
2023–24	Virginia	24	1	13.7	.280	.100	.500	2.0	1.4	.7	.2	2.5
2024–25	Memphis	16	1	11.7	.445	.500	.625	1.6	1.1	1.1	0.0	2.4
2025–26	Tennessee State	32	32	32.2	.420	.313	.730	3.7	4.5	1.7	0.0	11.7
Career		127	84	25.8	.379	.269	.737	3.0	3.1	1.3	.1	8.0
