= 2026 Ohio Valley Conference men's basketball tournament =

- Classification: Division I
- Season: 2025–26
- Teams: 8
- Site: Ford Center; Evansville, Indiana
- Champions: Tennessee State (3rd title)
- Winning coach: Nolan Smith (1st title)
- MVP: Dante Harris (Tennessee State)
- Attendance: 5,062 (Overall); 1,545 (Final)
- Television: ESPN2, ESPNU, ESPN+

2025–26 Ohio Valley Conference men's basketball standings
	Conf.				Overall
Team	W		L	PCT	W		L	PCT
Tennessee State †	15	–	5	.750	23	–	10	.697
Morehead State	15	–	5	.750	20	–	13	.606
Southeast Missouri State	14	–	6	.700	20	–	13	.606
UT Martin	13	–	7	.650	22	–	11	.667
SIU Edwardsville	12	–	8	.600	19	–	13	.594
Lindenwood	11	–	9	.550	18	–	15	.545
Little Rock	9	–	11	.450	12	–	20	.375
Eastern Illinois	8	–	12	.400	13	–	20	.394
Tennessee Tech	8	–	12	.400	13	–	18	.419
Southern Indiana	4	–	16	.200	7	–	23	.233
Western Illinois	1	–	19	.050	5	–	26	.161
† 2026 OVC tournament winner

The 2026 Ohio Valley Conference Men's Basketball Tournament was the final event of the 2025–26 NCAA Division I men's basketball season in the Ohio Valley Conference. The tournament was held March 4–7, 2026, at the Ford Center in Evansville, Indiana. The tournament winner, Tennessee State received the conference's automatic bid to the 2026 NCAA Division I men's basketball tournament.

== Seeds ==
Only the top eight teams in the conference qualified for the tournament. Teams were seeded by record within the conference, with a tiebreaker system to seed teams with identical conference records.

Seed	School	Conference Record	Tiebreaker
1	Tennessee State	15–5	2–0 vs. UT Martin
2	Morehead State	15–5	1–1 vs. UT Martin
3	Southeast Missouri State	14–6	
4	UT Martin	13–7	
5	SIU Edwardsville	12–8	
6	Lindenwood	11–9	
7	Little Rock	9–11	
8	Eastern Illinois	8–12	2–0 vs. Tennessee Tech
DNQ	Tennessee Tech	8–12	0–2 vs. Eastern Illinois
DNQ	Southern Indiana	4–16	
DNQ	Western Illinois	1–19	

== Schedule ==
Game	Time	Matchup	Score	Attendance	Television
First Round – Wednesday, March 4
1	6:00 p.m.	No. 5 SIU Edwardsville vs. No. 8 Eastern Illinois	71–77 ^{OT}	929	ESPN+
2	8:30 p.m.	No. 6 Lindenwood vs. No. 7 Little Rock	72–62	929	ESPN+
Quarterfinals – Thursday, March 5
3	6:00 p.m.	No. 4 UT Martin vs. No. 8 Eastern Illinois	66–63	1,101	ESPN+
4	8:30 p.m.	No. 3 Southeast Missouri State vs. No. 6 Lindenwood	68–66	1,101	ESPN+
Semifinals – Friday, March 6
5	7:00 p.m.	No. 1 Tennessee State vs. No. 4 UT Martin	68–55	1,487	ESPNU
6	9:30 p.m.	No. 2 Morehead State vs. No. 3 Southeast Missouri State	66–61	1,487	ESPNU
Final – Saturday, March 7
7	8:00 p.m.	No. 1 Tennessee State vs. No. 2 Morehead State	93–67	1,545	ESPN2
All game times in Central Time Zone; ranking denotes tournament seed.

== Bracket ==
First Round; Wednesday, March 4 ESPN+
5	SIU Edwardsville	71 ^{OT}
8	Eastern Illinois	77
6	Lindenwood	72
7	Little Rock	62

Quarterfinals; Thursday, March 5 ESPN+
4	UT Martin	66
8	Eastern Illinois	63
3	Southeast Missouri State	68
6	Lindenwood	66

Semifinals; Friday, March 6 ESPNU
1	Tennessee State	68
4	UT Martin	55
2	Morehead State	66
3	Southeast Missouri State	61

Final; Saturday, March 7 ESPN2
1	Tennessee State	93
2	Morehead State	67

== Game summaries ==
=== First Round ===
ESPN+

March 4
6:00 p.m. CST

Box score

No. 5 SIU Edwardsville 71, No. 8 Eastern Illinois 77 (OT)
Scoring by half: 31–40, 34–25 Overtime: 6–12
Pts: 19 – T. King; Rebs: 12 – A. Sakenis; Asts: 8 – J. Campion	Pts: 23 – Z. Fruster; Rebs: 13 – T. McMorris; Asts: 5 – M. White
Eastern Illinois advances to Quarterfinal Round

Ford Center, Evansville, IN
Referees: Steve Divine, James Gibson, Eric Lowe

ESPN+

March 4
8:30 p.m.

Box score

No. 6 Lindenwood 72, No. 7 Little Rock 62
Scoring by half: 35–21, 37–41
Pts: 24 – M. Nenadic; Rebs: 11 – Tied (2); Asts: 4 – A. Futrell	Pts: 17 – J. Lawson; Rebs: 11 – N. Kachi; Asts: 5 – J. Lawson
Lindenwood advances to Quarterfinal Round

Ford Center, Evansville, IN
Attendance: 929
Referees: Jason Baker, Aaron Denton, James Hicks

=== Quarterfinal Round ===
ESPN+

March 5
6:00 p.m. CST

Box score

No. 4 UT Martin 66, No. 8 Eastern Illinois 63
Scoring by half: 27–22, 39–41
Pts: 17 – Tied (2); Rebs: 10 – A. Bukumirović; Asts: 4 – F. Radaković	Pts: 18 – P. Turner; Rebs: 12 – T. McMorris; Asts: 3 – M. White
UT Martin advances to Semifinal Round

Ford Center, Evansville, IN
Referees: James Curran, Blake Harris, Kevin Mathis

ESPN+

March 5
8:30 p.m.

Box score

No. 3 Southeast Missouri State 68, No. 6 Lindenwood 66
Scoring by half: 25–34, 43–32
Pts: 16 – B. Stacker; Rebs: 5 – Tied (3); Asts: 3 – Tied (2)	Pts: 17 – A. Futrell; Rebs: 9 – Tied (2); Asts: 2 – Tied (2)
Southeast Missouri State advances to Semifinal Round

Ford Center, Evansville, IN
Attendance: 1,101
Referees: Steve Divine, James Hicks, Craig Murley

=== Semifinal Round ===
ESPNU

March 6
7:00 p.m. CST

Box score

No. 1 Tennessee State 68, No. 4 UT Martin 55
Scoring by half: 36–28, 32–27
Pts: 19 – A. Nkrumah; Rebs: 10 – A. Lorick III; Asts: 4 – Tied (2)	Pts: 17 – A. Bukumirović; Rebs: 6 – P. Santos; Asts: 3 – Tied (2)
Tennessee State advances to Final Round

Ford Center, Evansville, IN
Referees: Kevin Driver, Chris Fuller, Barry Mathis

ESPNU

March 6
9:30 p.m.

Box score

No. 2 Morehead State 66, No. 3 Southeast Missouri State 61
Scoring by half: 29–36, 37–25
Pts: 22 – A. Mellouk; Rebs: 14 – J. Carroll; Asts: 2 – C. Dawson	Pts: 17 – B. Stacker; Rebs: 8 – M. Bell; Asts: 6 – B. Ward
Morehead State advances to Final Round

Ford Center, Evansville, IN
Attendance: 1,487
Referees: Kyle Bottoms, Jabir Walker, Bryan Washer

=== Final Round ===
ESPN2

March 7
8:00 p.m. CST

Box score

No. 1 Tennessee State 93, No. 2 Morehead State 67
Scoring by half: 55–34, 38–33
Pts: 18 – A. Lorick III; Rebs: 11 – D. Harris; Asts: 6 – A. Nkrumah	Pts: 17 – G. Marshall; Rebs: 10 – J. Carroll; Asts: 3 – J. LeGree
Championship

Ford Center, Evansville, IN
Attendance: 1,545
Referees: Kevin Driver, Jabir Walker, Bryan Washer

== Awards and honors ==
=== All-Tournament Team ===
Player	Team
Travis Harper II	Tennessee State
Dante Harris ^{MVP}	Tennessee State
George Marshall	Morehead State
Aaron Nkrumah	Tennessee State
Braxton Stacker	Southeast Missouri State

MVP denotes Most Valuable Player
