= Sam M. Vadalabene =

American politician

Salvador Martin "Sam" Vadalabene
- Born: July 31, 1914; Detroit, Michigan
- Died: May 1, 1994 (aged 79); Maryville, Illinois
- Occupation: Politician

Salvador Martin "Sam" Vadalabene (July 31, 1914 – May 1, 1994) was an American politician.

Born in Detroit, Michigan, Vadalabene served in the 29th Infantry Regiment in Europe during World War II. Vadalabene lived in Edwardsville, Illinois and served as auditor for Edwardsville Township. Vadalabene served in the Illinois House of Representatives from 1967 to 1971 and then served in the Illinois Senate from 1971 until his death in 1994. He was a Democrat. Vadalabene died from a heart attack in a nursing home in Maryville, Illinois.

== Legacy ==
The Vadalabene Center at Southern Illinois University Edwardsville is named for Vadalabene, a major supporter of the school from before its founding until his death.
