= Vadalabene Center =

Building in Illinois, United States

- The Vadalabene, The VC
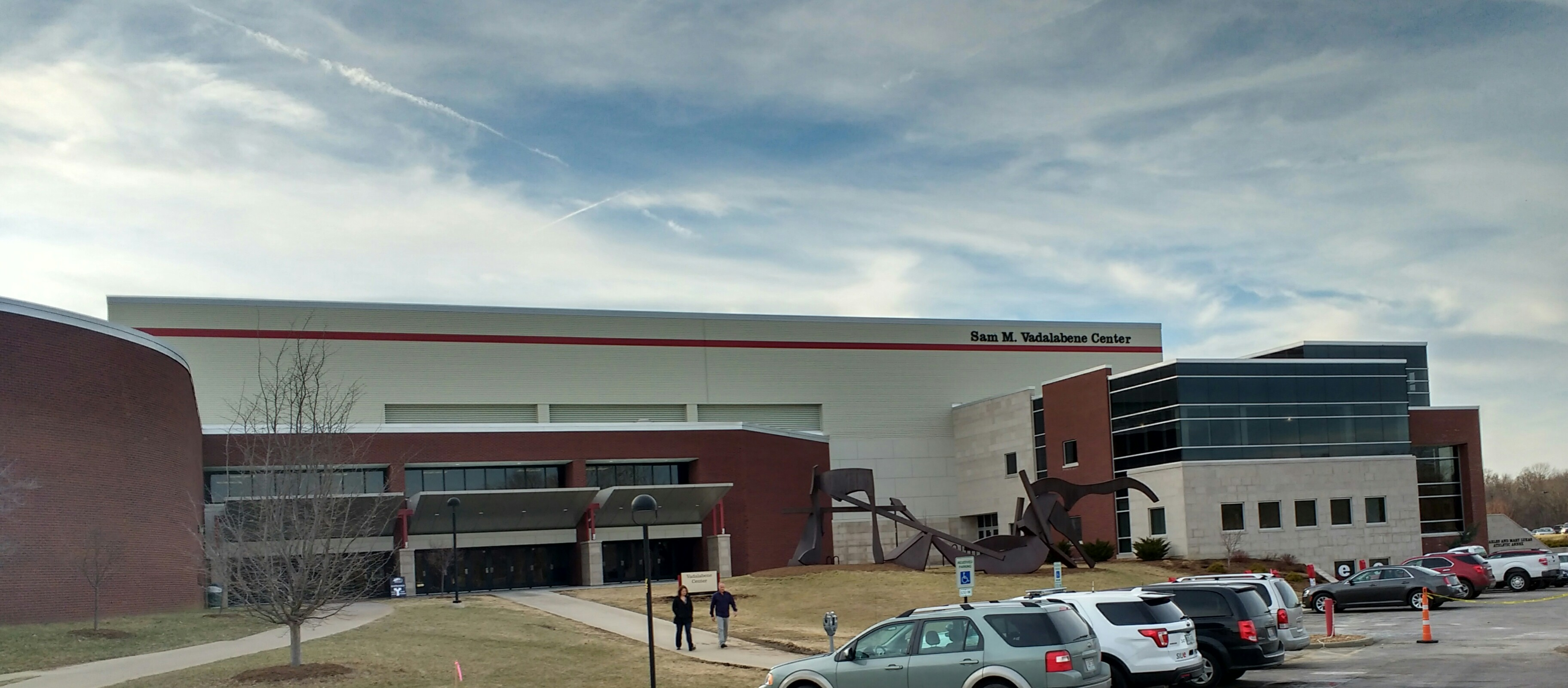
- Interactive map of Vadalabene Center
- Full name: Sam M. Vadalabene Center
- Address: 35 Circle Drive
- Location: Edwardsville, Illinois
- Coordinates: 38°47′45.56″N 89°59′59.58″W
- Owner: Southern Illinois University Edwardsville
- Operator: SIUE Athletics Department
- Capacity: 4,000+
- Record attendance: 4,392

Construction
- Opened: December 5, 1984
- Renovated: 2008, 2014
- Expanded: 1993, 2012

Tenants
- SIUE Cougars men's & women's basketball, volleyball & wrestling teams

The Sam M. Vadalabene Center is a multi-purpose sports and recreation building on the campus of Southern Illinois University Edwardsville (SIUE) that features an arena (known as "First Community Arena" for sponsorship reasons) with a seating capacity of just over 4,000. The Vadalabene, which opened in 1984, was named in honor of Illinois State Senator Sam M. Vadalabene (1914–1994), who was a long-time and ardent supporter of the university. The Vad Pad is home to the SIUE Cougars basketball, volleyball, and wrestling teams. In addition to the arena, the Vadalabene also houses a swimming pool, classrooms, offices, and several activity areas. The Student Fitness Center (SFC), built in 1993, is immediately adjacent to and an integral part of the venue and contains numerous additional recreational and fitness facilities.

In addition to SIUE athletics, the Vadalabene hosts the university's commencement ceremonies, trade shows, concerts, and sports events sponsored by the National Collegiate Athletic Association (NCAA), the Illinois High School Association (IHSA), the Prairie State Games, and the State Games of America. The Vadalabene was host to the 1986 & '87 NCAA Division II wrestling championships which were televised on ESPN. In 2000, the Vad Pad hosted the IHSA class AA sectional semifinals and finals, where future NBA player Darius Miles led East St. Louis High School past Edwardsville High School in the championship game in front of a sold-out crowd. In 2002, rapper Nelly played a concert at the Vadalabene. In May, 2010, the Vadalabene was site for a Guinness World Record--- for most people clicking a pen at one time, despite an attendance of only about 100 at the event.

== First Community Arena at Vadalabene Center ==
On August 29, 2019, it was announced that the arena in the Vadalabene would be named First Community Arena at Vadalabene Center for the next ten years. First Community Credit Union paid a $2.3 million fee to acquire the rights for 10 years through June 30, 2029 with a two-year extension provided, making the potential end date June 30, 2031. First Community, based in Chesterfield, Missouri has more than 40 locations across the Greater St. Louis metro area, including branches in eight Illinois communities.

== Renovations and additions ==
The Vadalabene finished a $6 million renovation project in 2008 to coincide with SIUE's move to the NCAA's Division I. The Vadalabene underwent a complete overhaul, adding a new floor, dressing room, seating system (increasing seating from c.2400), plus classroom and office space. After one season playing on the new floor, rain from a heavy storm flooded and ruined the hardwood because an opening in the roof had not been properly sealed; a similar flooding event had occurred in 1990.

On November 29, 2012, the $5.4 million Lukas Athletics Annex was dedicated. Facilitated by a $4.2 million donation from the Charles S. and Mary L. Lukas Estate, the 29,100-square-foot (2,700 m^{2}) annex houses the offices of the entire SIUE Cougars athletics program in one location for the first time.

On February 14, 2014, the SIU Board of Trustees approved the funding to expand the SFC weight room and to renovate the south entrance to the Vadalabene. The cost of these improvements is budgeted at $2.6 million.

== Events ==
Jason Holmes owns the Vadalabene record for most points scored in a basketball game, with 45 on November 20, 1993; the women's record is 41 points, by Amanda Hyde of IP Fort Wayne on November 26, 2013 (high Cougar score was All-American Misi Clark's 40 on January 20, 2000). SIUE's longest home winning streak at the Vad Pad is 27 by the women's basketball team during the 1988-90 seasons; the men's record is 21, 1985-87.

The largest crowd at the Vadalabene was for a men's basketball game between the then-Division II SIUE Cougars and the Division I SIU Carbondale Salukis on January 8, 1987, won by SIUC 84-83 in overtime. The largest post-renovation crowd at the Vadalabene was 4,157 on January 21, 2012 against the then-10th ranked Murray State Racers in the first nationally televised (on ESPNU) basketball game played at the Vadalabene.

SIUE women's basketball won its first home game against a Division I opponent January 19, 2009 over the Eastern Kentucky Colonels; on December 14, 2010, the men got their first Division I win against the Kennesaw State Owls.

On March 4, 2016, Democratic presidential candidate Bernie Sanders gave a speech at the Vadalabene, with over 4,000 people in attendance.

== See also ==
- List of NCAA Division I basketball arenas
