= 2024–25 Southern Indiana Screaming Eagles men's basketball team =

American college basketball season

2024–25 Southern Indiana Screaming Eagles men's basketball
- Conference: Ohio Valley Conference
- Record: 10–20 (5–15 OVC)
- Head coach: Stan Gouard (5th season)
- Assistant coaches: John Spruance; Jon Aldridge; Doug Novsek
- Home arena: Liberty Arena

2024–25 Ohio Valley Conference men's basketball standings
	Conf.				Overall
Team	W		L	PCT	W		L	PCT
Southeast Missouri State	15	–	5	.750	21	–	12	.636
SIU Edwardsville †	13	–	7	.650	22	–	12	.647
Tennessee State	12	–	8	.600	17	–	16	.515
Little Rock	12	–	8	.600	19	–	14	.576
Tennessee Tech	10	–	10	.500	15	–	17	.469
Lindenwood*	10	–	10	.500	16	–	17	.485
Morehead State	10	–	10	.500	15	–	17	.469
UT Martin	9	–	11	.450	14	–	19	.424
Eastern Illinois	8	–	12	.400	12	–	19	.387
Western Illinois	6	–	14	.300	12	–	19	.387
Southern Indiana*	5	–	15	.250	10	–	20	.333
† 2025 OVC tournament winner * ineligible for the 2025 NCAA tournament due to transition period

The 2024–25 Southern Indiana Screaming Eagles men's basketball team represented the University of Southern Indiana during the 2024–25 NCAA Division I men's basketball season. The Screaming Eagles were led by fifth-year head coach Stan Gouard and played their home games at the newly renamed Liberty Arena in Evansville, Indiana, as members of the Ohio Valley Conference (OVC).

This season marked Southern Indiana's third year of a four-year transition period from Division II to Division I. As a result, the Screaming Eagles are not eligible for the NCAA tournament until the 2026–27 season.

== Previous season ==
The Screaming Eagles finished the 2023–24 season 8–24, 5–13 in OVC play, to finish in a tie for eighth place. They were defeated by Tennessee State in the first round of the OVC tournament.

== Roster ==
2024–25 Southern Indiana Screaming Eagles men's basketball team
Players
Coaches

Pos.	#	Name	Height	Weight	Year	Previous school	Hometown
G	0	Ryan Hall	6 ft 5 in (1.96 m)	190 lb (86 kg)	Jr	Iowa Lakes CC	Kettering, OH
G	1	Braxton Jones	6 ft 0 in (1.83 m)	175 lb (79 kg)	Jr	Garden City CC	Monroe, NJ
G	2	Jayland Randall	6 ft 5 in (1.96 m)	180 lb (82 kg)	Jr	Alabama A&M	Detroit, MI
F/C	3	Jadyn Shider	6 ft 8 in (2.03 m)	230 lb (104 kg)	Jr	Northwest Florida	Albany, GA
G	4	Sam Kodi	6 ft 3 in (1.91 m)	185 lb (84 kg)	Jr	Western Texas College	Manchester, NH
G	5	Jack Campion	5 ft 11 in (1.8 m)	170 lb (77 kg)	Jr	Milton HS	Milton, WI
G	8	Luther Jr. Smith	6 ft 1 in (1.85 m)	180 lb (82 kg)	So	Sussex Hamilton HS	Milwaukee, WI
F	10	Jack Mielke	6 ft 7 in (2.01 m)	220 lb (100 kg)	GS	Downers Grove North HS	Downers Grove, IL
G	11	Damoni Harrison	6 ft 5 in (1.96 m)	180 lb (82 kg)	Jr	Tallahassee State College	Atlanta, GA
F	12	Stephen Olowoniyi	6 ft 8 in (2.03 m)	200 lb (91 kg)	So	VMI	Melbourne, Australia
G	13	Sam Mervis	5 ft 11 in (1.8 m)	175 lb (79 kg)	GS	Indiana State	Indianapolis, IN
G	15	Jared Washington	6 ft 3 in (1.91 m)	200 lb (91 kg)	Jr	Weatherford College	Arlington, TX
G	20	Johnny Semany	6 ft 0 in (1.83 m)	160 lb (73 kg)	Jr	Lawrence	Danville, CA
C	21	Alex Horiuk	7 ft 0 in (2.13 m)	250 lb (113 kg)	Jr	UT Rio Grande Valley	Chernivtsi, Ukraine
G	22	Josiah Dunham	6 ft 0 in (1.83 m)	180 lb (82 kg)	Fr	Evansville Christian School	Evansville, IN
G/F	33	Cayden Gehlhausen	6 ft 8 in (2.03 m)	195 lb (88 kg)	Fr	North HS	Evansville, IN
F	35	Luke Davis	6 ft 8 in (2.03 m)	210 lb (95 kg)	Fr	Evansville Christian School	Newburgh, IN
F	50	Nick Hittle	6 ft 10 in (2.08 m)	245 lb (111 kg)	GS	Indiana State	Indianapolis, IN

Head coach

- Stan Gouard (Southern Indiana)

Assistant coach(es)

- John Spruance (Hope)
- Jon Aldridge (Indianapolis)
- Doug Novsek (Southern Illinois)

Legend

- (C) Team captain
- (S) Suspended
- (I) Ineligible
- (W) Walk-on
- Injured
- Current redshirt

Roster
Last update: November 27, 2024

== Schedule and results ==
Date time, TV	Rank^{#}	Opponent^{#}	Result	Record	Site (attendance) city, state
Non-conference regular season
November 4, 2024*; 7:00 p.m., FS1		at DePaul	L 78–80 ^{OT}	0–1	Wintrust Arena (3,051); Chicago, IL
November 7, 2024*; 7:00 p.m., ESPN+		Bucknell	L 69–75 ^{OT}	0–2	Liberty Arena (1,961); Evansville, IN
November 11, 2024*; 6:00 p.m., ESPN+		at Marshall; I-64 Showcase	L 63–77	0–3	Cam Henderson Center (3,615); Huntington, WV
November 13, 2024*; 5:30 p.m., ESPN+		at Bellarmine; I-64 Showcase	W 71–69	1–3	Knights Hall (1,527); Louisville, KY
November 16, 2024*; 6:00 p.m., ESPN+		at Purdue Fort Wayne	L 74–93	1–4	Memorial Coliseum (1,161); Fort Wayne, IN
November 22, 2024*; 7:00 p.m., ESPN+		South Dakota	W 92–83	2–4	Liberty Arena (1,544); Evansville, IN
November 25, 2024*; 7:00 p.m., ESPN+		Indiana State	W 87–77	3–4	Liberty Arena (2,351); Evansville, IN
December 2, 2024*; 7:00 p.m., ESPN+		East–West	W 104–46	4–4	Liberty Arena (969); Evansville, IN
December 7, 2024*; 2:00 p.m., ESPN+		at Southern Illinois	L 70–73	4–5	Banterra Center (4,121); Carbondale, IL
December 15, 2024*; 1:00 p.m., ESPN+		Shawnee State	W 91–56	5–5	Liberty Arena (1,182); Evansville, IN
OVC regular season
December 19, 2024; 7:30 p.m., ESPN+		Tennessee State	W 77–75	6–5 (1–0)	Liberty Arena (1,311); Evansville, IN
December 21, 2024; 3:30 p.m., ESPN+		UT Martin	L 46–77	6–6 (1–1)	Liberty Arena (1,652); Evansville, IN
December 31, 2024; 7:30 p.m., ESPN+		Morehead State	L 68–70	6–7 (1–2)	Liberty Arena (2,091); Evansville, IN
January 2, 2025; 7:30 p.m., ESPN+		at Tennessee Tech	L 64–68	6–8 (1–3)	Hooper Eblen Center (1,296); Cookeville, TN
January 9, 2025; 7:30 p.m., ESPN+		at Southeast Missouri State	L 66–77	6–9 (1–4)	Show Me Center (805); Cape Girardeau, MO
January 12, 2025; 3:00 p.m., ESPN+		at Little Rock	L 58–78	6–10 (1–5)	Jack Stephens Center (771); Little Rock, AR
January 16, 2025; 7:30 p.m., ESPN+		Lindenwood	W 80–73	7–10 (2–5)	Liberty Arena (1,669); Evansville, IN
January 18, 2025; 3:30 p.m., ESPN+		Western Illinois	W 78–66	8–10 (3–5)	Liberty Arena (2,369); Evansville, IN
January 23, 2025; 7:30 p.m., ESPN+		at SIU Edwardsville	L 76–82	8–11 (3–6)	First Community Arena (1,423); Edwardsville, IL
January 25, 2025; 3:30 p.m., ESPN+		at Eastern Illinois	W 64–60	9–11 (4–6)	Groniger Arena (1,710); Charleston, IL
January 28, 2025; 6:30 p.m., ESPN+		at Morehead State	L 65–66	9–12 (4–7)	Ellis Johnson Arena (1,236); Morehead, KY
February 1, 2025; 3:30 p.m., ESPN+		Tennessee Tech	L 65–78	9–13 (4–8)	Liberty Arena (1,676); Evansville, IN
February 6, 2025; 7:30 p.m., ESPN+		Little Rock	L 56–74	9–14 (4–9)	Liberty Arena (1,438); Evansville, IN
February 8, 2025; 7:30 p.m., ESPN+		Southeast Missouri State	L 74–79	9–15 (4–10)	Liberty Arena (3,097); Evansville, IN
February 13, 2025; 7:30 p.m., ESPN+		at Western Illinois	L 62–87	9–16 (4–11)	Western Hall (512); Macomb, IL
February 15, 2025; 3:30 p.m., ESPN+		at Lindenwood	L 78–81 ^{OT}	9–17 (4–12)	Robert F. Hyland Arena (1,837); St. Charles, MO
February 20, 2025; 7:30 p.m., ESPN+		Eastern Illinois	L 54–63	9–18 (4–13)	Liberty Arena (1,344); Evansville, IN
February 22, 2025; 7:30 p.m., ESPN+		SIU Edwardsville	W 82–68	10–18 (5–13)	Liberty Arena (2,196); Evansville, IN
February 27, 2025; 7:30 p.m., ESPN+		at UT Martin	L 63–79	10–19 (5–14)	Skyhawk Arena (1,787); Martin, TN
March 1, 2025; 3:30 p.m., ESPN+		at Tennessee State	L 69–74	10–20 (5–15)	Gentry Center (810); Nashville, TN
*Non-conference game. ^{#}Rankings from AP poll. (#) Tournament seedings in parentheses. All times are in Central.
