= 2024–25 SIU Edwardsville Cougars men's basketball team =

American college basketball season

2024–25 SIU Edwardsville Cougars men's basketball

Ohio Valley tournament champions

NCAA tournament, First Round
- Conference: Ohio Valley Conference
- Record: 22–12 (13–7 OVC)
- Head coach: Brian Barone (6th season)
- Associate head coach: Colin Schneider
- Assistant coaches: Angres Thorpe; Ryan Hellenthal; Mike Waldo (Special assistant to the head coach); Jay Bradley (Director of player development)
- Home arena: First Community Arena

2024–25 Ohio Valley Conference men's basketball standings
	Conf.				Overall
Team	W		L	PCT	W		L	PCT
Southeast Missouri State	15	–	5	.750	21	–	12	.636
SIU Edwardsville †	13	–	7	.650	22	–	12	.647
Tennessee State	12	–	8	.600	17	–	16	.515
Little Rock	12	–	8	.600	19	–	14	.576
Tennessee Tech	10	–	10	.500	15	–	17	.469
Lindenwood*	10	–	10	.500	16	–	17	.485
Morehead State	10	–	10	.500	15	–	17	.469
UT Martin	9	–	11	.450	14	–	19	.424
Eastern Illinois	8	–	12	.400	12	–	19	.387
Western Illinois	6	–	14	.300	12	–	19	.387
Southern Indiana*	5	–	15	.250	10	–	20	.333
† 2025 OVC tournament winner * ineligible for the 2025 NCAA tournament due to transition period

The 2024–25 SIU Edwardsville Cougars men's basketball team represented Southern Illinois University Edwardsville in the 2024–25 NCAA Division I men's basketball season. The Cougars, led by sixth-year head coach Brian Barone, play their home games at the First Community Arena in Edwardsville, Illinois as members of the Ohio Valley Conference (OVC). As the No. 2 seed in the OVC tournament, the Cougars defeated Tennessee State and Southeast Missouri State to win the tournament championship. As a result, they received the conference's automatic bid to the NCAA tournament, the school's first-ever trip to the tournament.

== Previous season ==
The Cougars finished the 2023–24 season 17–16, 9–9 in OVC play to finish in sixth place. As the No. 6 seed in the OVC tournament, they defeated Southern Indiana in the first round before losing to eventual tournament champion Morehead State.

SIUE guard Damarco Minor was honored as a member of the All-OVC First Team.

== Season forecast ==
Six players return from the 2023–24 squad. They are joined by one freshman, four transfers from junior colleges, two transfers from other Division I programs, and two graduate students from non-Division I schools.

In a vote of Ohio Valley Conference head men's basketball coaches and communication directors, SIUE was picked to finish 3rd in the 11 team Ohio Valley Conference.

=== 2024–25 OVC Men's Basketball predicted order of finish ===
1. Little Rock (20 first-place votes) – 200 points
2. Western Illinois – 172
3. SIUE (2) – 151
4. Tennessee State – 134
5. Morehead State – 131
6. Eastern Illinois – 87
7. Southeast Missouri – 86
8. Southern Indiana – 79
9. Lindenwood – 67
10. UT Martin – 52
11. Tennessee Tech – 51

== Regular season ==
The Cougars won 20 games for the first time since transitioning to Division I status in 2008. After going 7–4 in nonconference play, SIUE finished 13–7 in the Ohio Valley Conference, establishing a new school record for OVC wins and earning the No. 2 seed in the OVC Tournament.

== Postseason ==
After a double bye as the #2 seed, the Cougars faced the #3 seed Tennessee State Tigers in the OVC Tournament semifinals. With solid defense, SIUE took a 10-point halftime lead after being up on TSU by as many as 12 points. The Tigers, the highest-scoring team in the OVC, demonstrated why in the second half, eliminating the Cougars' lead and briefly taking the lead before the SIUE defense locked down, hung on, and hung tough for the win. Ray'Sean Taylor was largely responsible for SIUE hanging on, scoring 18 of his game-high 24 points in the second half. However, although Taylor was the only Cougar scoring in double figures, the win was a team effort, with all nine players who saw action scoring and having at least one rebound, and eight players having at least one assist. With the win, the Cougars advanced to the OVC Championship game for the first time to meet #1 seed Southeast Missouri, who defeated SIUE twice in the regular season, most recently 83–68 on Feb. 27 at First Community Arena.

SIUE's Declan Dillon took an elbow to his face early in Saturday's Ohio Valley Conference title game against Southeast Missouri that had blood streaming down his face. Dillon, who played the rest of the game with a large wound near his eyebrow, embodied the Cougars’ play Saturday in Evansville, Indiana. The second-seeded Cougars started slowly, turning the ball over four times in the first few minutes and allowing the top-seeded SEMO Redhawks to go out to a 14–7 lead. Then they turned things around by rebounding, getting second-chance baskets, and locking down on defense. SIUE led SEMO 35–24 at the half, but the second half started much like the first, and the Redhawks had a 10-1 run to open and tied the game at 36-36. After again being tied at 38, the Cougars went on a 16-0 run to take over the game, and never led by less than 14 from then on, winning by 69–48. “We talked about trust,” an emotional SIUE coach Brian Barone said after the game on ESPN2. “We talk about playing for one another, and that's what those guys just did. It feels amazing, because I love those guys right there. And it's amazing.” SIUE held Southeast Missouri State to an absolutely miserable shooting night from beyond the arc. The Redhawks had averaged more than seven made three-pointers per game, but against the Cougars were held to a season low of 3 of 24 (13 percent) from long range. SEMO finished the second half shooting only 1 of 17 (under 6 percent) and was held without a field goal for more than six minutes. Once again, Ray'Sean Taylor led the team in scoring, with 20 points, and all of his 11 second half points were from the free throw line---Taylor's scoring made him SIUE's all-time leading scorer, and he now has 1,952 points in his career. Ring Malith followed with 12 points, and Brian Taylor II had 10. Malith, the Taylor cousins, and Myles Thompson led the Cougars rebounding with 7 boards apiece. This was the Cougars' first win over the Redhawks this season, having been swept in the regular season. With the win, SIUE was the first team to garner an automatic bid to the 2025 NCAA Division I men's basketball tournament and secured the Cougars' first OVC title and the school's first-ever trip to the Division I championship, where they are projected to be a #16 seed and to play in the First Four in Dayton, Ohio. "Hats off to Edwardsville with the way they played. They played a phenomenal game and had a great game plan," SEMO coach Brad Korn said. "It stings. It don't feel very good because we didn't play our best ball, but it also had a lot to do with them. I give them credit." SIUE coach Barone declared,"We're going to be dancing all night, and we're going to be dancing into next week."

On the March 16 Selection Sunday, the NCAA Selection Committee placed the Cougars in the Midwest Regional versus the 2nd ranked and 2nd seeded Houston Cougars.

The top-seeded Houston Cougars spotted the SIUE Cougars a 4-2 lead in the opening minutes, then they went on a tear, with a 25-6 run over the next seven minutes while rolling to a 52-24 halftime lead. Then, they calmly ran out the string in the second half en route to ending SIUE's first NCAA entry with a 78-40 victory at Wichita State's Intrust Bank Arena on the way to their national runnerup finish. "We didn't do what we needed to do and Houston won the game," SIUE head coach Brian Barone said, "but this is a good team, man. We gave up 52 points in first half, and (Houston) was just as relentless in the second half. That team can win it all, no doubt." Barone was just as quick to give kudos to the large crowd of SIUE fans that made the trip to Wichita. "Are you kidding me," a choked-up Barone said on postgame radio. "Listen to our fans. We heard them the entire game. They don't want this to end and neither do I." SIUE shot only 31.7 percent overall and just 20 percent in the second half. They made just two of 24 three-point attempts. Ray’Sean Taylor, the Ohio Valley Conference Player of the Year, led SIUE with 10 points. Teammate and cousin Brian Taylor II added another 10. A fifth-season grad student from Collinsville, Ray'Sean Taylor ended his collegiate career as SIUE's all-time leading scorer with 1,926 points. Houston, the Big 12 Conference champion, shot 42 percent overall and made 10 of 28 treys. The top-seeded Houston Cougars shot the lights out in the first half and put any notions of an upset out of the minds of the No. 16-seeded SIUE Cougars. Houston shot a sizzling 61 percent in the first half, including a combined five 3-point baskets by Milos Uzan, J.J. Cryer and Emanuel Sharp during an early run that put the game away early. Overall, Cryer and Uzan combined for 31 points. Barrone said that despite the loss, a solid foundtion has been built for SIUE basketball, along with memories of a special season. "We have a group of guys who care," Barrone said. "You can't make up what this group has been through. They made people believe, and belief is a powerful thing."

== Honors ==
In voting by league head coaches and communications directors prior to the OVC Tournament, Cougar guard Ray'Sean Taylor, who has averaged 20.4 points, 4.5 rebounds, 3.0 assists and 2.2 steals per game was voted the 2024-25 Ohio Valley Conference Player of the Year.

Graduate student guard Player of the Year Ray'Sean Taylor was named to the eight-person All-OVC First Team, while his cousin junior guard Brian Taylor II was named to the eight-person All-OVC Second Team.

After being named the Ohio Valley Conference Player of the Year and the Ohio Valley Conference Tournament Most Valuable Player, SIUE graduate student guard Ray'Sean Taylor was named one of 35 finalists for the 2024-25 Lou Henson Award which is presented annually to the top player in mid-major college basketball. The Lou Henson Award honors the former Illinois and New Mexico State head coach, who was the winningest coach at both schools, with a total of 775 victories in 41 seasons.

On March 18, the National Association of Basketball Coaches announced the Division I All-District Teams and Coaches of the Year. SIUE graduate student guard Ray'Sean Taylor was named to the Great Lakes District Second Team. The Great Lakes District included players from Illinois, Indiana, Michigan, Minnesota, and Wisconsin. This was Taylor's second career All-District selection, having also been an All-District pick in 2022-23.

SIUE men's basketball Head Coach Brian Barone has been selected as an Illinois Basketball Coaches Association Co-Coach of the Year. After leading SIUE to its first 20-win regular season at the Division I level, Barone guided the Cougars to their first-ever Ohio Valley Conference Championship when SIUE defeated Southeast Missouri in the OVC Championship game. The Cougars then advanced to the program's first-ever Division I NCAA Tournament. A No. 16 seed in the Midwest Region, SIUE fell to the eventual national runner-up Houston in the first round.

SIUE men's basketball graduate guard Ray'Sean Taylor was named to the 2025 Scholar-Athlete Team as chosen by the Division I-AAA Athletics Directors Association. Players from all Division I-AAA ADA schools are eligible if they have a grade point average of at least 3.2 (on a 4.0 scale), have been a starting player or a significant contributing reserve player, have played in at least half of their team's scheduled games, and have at least junior academic standing.

SIUE graduate guard Ray'Sean Taylor was selected as the Ohio Valley Conference Male Athlete of the Year for 2024-25. Taylor becomes SIUE's first-ever OVC Athlete of the Year selection and is the 50th selection since the first award was given out following the 1976-77 season (there have been multiple award winners in some years).

== Roster ==
2023–24 SIU Edwardsville Cougars men's basketball team
Players
Coaches

Pos.	#	Name	Height	Weight	Year	Previous school	Hometown
F	0	Ring Malith	6 ft 9 in (2.06 m)	180 lb (82 kg)	Jr	Barton CC/Rocky Bayou Christian HS	Twic, South Sudan
G	1	Jordan Pickett	6 ft 3 in (1.91 m)	190 lb (86 kg)	So	Belleville East HS	Belleville, IL
G	2	Desmond Polk	6 ft 4 in (1.93 m)	175 lb (79 kg)	GS	Link Year Prep/La Lumiere School	Milwaukee, WI
G	3	Ray'Sean Taylor	6 ft 1 in (1.85 m)	175 lb (79 kg)	GS	Collinsville HS	Collinsville, IL
F	4	Darrion Baker (injured) (redshirt)	6 ft 8 in (2.03 m)	225 lb (102 kg)	RS Fr	Akron/Hillcrest HS	Chicago, IL
G	5	Declan Dillon	6 ft 1 in (1.85 m)	200 lb (91 kg)	GS	Winona State/Peoria Noitre Dame	Peoria, IL
G	10	Jordan Hamilton	6 ft 6 in (1.98 m)	225 lb (102 kg)	Jr	Southern Idaho	Memphis, TN
G	11	Brian Taylor II	6 ft 4 in (1.93 m)	175 lb (79 kg)	Jr	Milwaukee/De Smet HS	St. Louis, MO
G	15	Raynard Horry	5 ft 11 in (1.8 m)	170 lb (77 kg)	So	Southeastern Illinois/Fort Zumwalt West	O'Fallon, MO
F	21	Myles Thompson	6 ft 7 in (2.01 m)	240 lb (109 kg)	Jr	Barton CC/Hutchinson HS	Hutchinson, KS
G	23	Cham Okey	6 ft 6 in (1.98 m)	200 lb (91 kg)	Fr	Phoenix Prep/Austin HS	Minneapolis, MN
F	24	Kyle Thomas	6 ft 10 in (2.08 m)	235 lb (107 kg)	Jr	Bradley/Benet Academy	Bolingbrook, IL
F	33	Jo Valrie (injured) (redshirt)	6 ft 5 in (1.96 m)	180 lb (82 kg)	GS	Point Park	Houston, TX
C	34	Arnas Sakenis	6 ft 11 in (2.11 m)	260 lb (118 kg)	Jr	Andrew HS	Tinley Park, IL
G	40	Eddiean Tirado	6 ft 4 in (1.93 m)	190 lb (86 kg)	Sr	Indian Hills CC/Calusa Prep	Miami, FL

Head coach

- Brian Barone (Marquette)

Assistant coach(es)

- Colin Schneider (Green Bay)
- Ryan Hellenthal (UIC)
- Angres Thorpe (Saint Leo College)
- Mike Waldo (SIUE)
- Jay Bradley (Barclay College)

Legend

- (C) Team captain
- (S) Suspended
- (I) Ineligible
- (W) Walk-on
- Injured
- Current redshirt

Roster

== Schedule and results ==
Date time, TV	Rank^{#}	Opponent^{#}	Result	Record	High points	High rebounds	High assists	Site (attendance) city, state
Exhibition
October 27, 2024; 3:00 PM		Missouri Baptist	W 87–56		23 – R. Taylor	10 – Malith	6 – R. Taylor	First Community Arena; Edwardsville, IL
Non-conference regular season
November 4, 2024; 7:30 PM, ESPN+		Westminster College	W 95–42	1–0	15 – Tied	10 – R. Taylor	6 – R. Taylor	First Community Arena (1,233); Edwardsville, IL
November 6, 2024; 7:00 PM, BTN		at No. 17 Indiana	L 61–80	1–1	17 – R. Taylor	9 – Sakenis	3 – Thompson	Assembly Hall (17,222); Bloomington, IN
November 8, 2024; 7:00 PM, Peacock		at Illinois	L 58–90	1–2	14 – R. Taylor	11 – Valrie	4 – R. Taylor	State Farm Center (15,544); Champaign, IL
November 12, 2024; 6:00 PM, ESPN+		Indiana State	W 77–72	2–2	22 – R. Taylor	7 – Baker	6 – R. Taylor	Hulman Center (4,264); Terre Haute, IN
November 15, 2024; 4:00 PM		Western Michigan; Bronco Classic	W 79–60	3–2	30 – R. Taylor	9 – Baker	7 – R. Taylor	University Arena (1,258); Kalamazoo, MI
November 16, 2024; 2:00 PM, Bronco All-Access		vs. Canisius; Bronco Classic	W 76–58	4–2	23 – B. Taylor	7 – Baker	7 – R. Taylor	University Arena (186); Kalamazoo, MI
November 19, 2024; 6:00 PM, ESPN+		at Green Bay	L 57–82	4–3	16 – B. Taylor	6 – Tied	8 – R. Taylor	Kress Events Center (1,772); Green Bay, WI
November 23, 2024; 6:00 PM, ESPN+		St. Ambrose	W 83–49	5–3	15 – R.Taylor	19 – Malith	7 – R Taylor	First Community Arena (984); Edwardsville, IL
November 29, 2024; 6:00 PM, ESPN+		North Florida	L 73–78	5–4	19 – Polk	8 – Malith	9 – B. Taylor	First Community Arena (1,058); Edwardsville, IL
December 8, 2024; 1:00 PM, ESPN+		Ball State	W 82–69	6–4	27 – R. Taylor	14 – Sakenis	3 – R. Taylor	First Community Arena (1,015); Edwardsville, IL
December 15, 2024; 1:00 PM, ESPN+		Eureka College	W 100–52	7–4	18 – R. Taylor	11 – Okey	5 – B. Taylor	First Community Arena (1,007); Edwardsville, IL
Ohio Valley Conference regular season
December 19, 2024; 7:00 PM, ESPN+		Little Rock	L 56–60	7–5 (0–1)	18 – R. Taylor	8 – B. Taylor	3 – R. Taylor	Jack Stephens Center (820); Little Rock, AR
December 21, 2014; 3:45 PM, ESPN+		Southeast Missouri State	L 64–80	7–6 (0–2)	16 – R. Taylor	6 – Malith	2 – 4 Tied	Show Me Center (1,123); Cape Girardeau, MO
January 2, 2025; 7:30 PM, ESPNU/ESPN+		Western Illinois	W 77–66	8–6 (1–2)	23 – R. Taylor	8 – Malith	4 – Malith	First Community Arena (1,989); Edwardsville, IL
January 4, 2025; 3:30 PM, ESPN+		Lindenwood	W 58–47	9–6 (2–2)	18 – R. Taylor	8 – R. Taylor	3 – Dillon	First Community Arena (1,347); Edwardsville, IL
January 7, 2025; 7:30 PM, ESPN+		Eastern Illinois	W 60–57	10–6 (3–2)	19 – R. Taylor	11 – Malith	3 – Tied	Groniger Arena (635); Charleston, IL
January 11, 2025; 3:30 PM, ESPN+		Tennessee Tech	W 67–59	11–6 (4–2)	25 – R. Taylor	9 – Malith	4 – Dillon	First Community Arena (1,505); Edwardsville, IL
January 16, 2025; 8:00 PM, ESPN+		Tennessee State	W 87–80 ^{2OT}	12–6 (5–2)	23 – B. Taylor	8 – Dillon	6 – Malith	Gentry Complex (1,204); Nashville, TN
January 18, 2025; 3:30 PM, ESPN+		UT Martin	L 82–85	12–7 (5–3)	23 – R. Taylor	5 – R. Taylor	5 – B. Taylor	Skyhawk Arena (1,664); Martin, TN
January 23, 2025; 7:30 PM, ESPN+		Southern Indiana	W 82–76	13–7 (6–3)	24 – R. Taylor	6 – Thompson	3 – Pickett	First Community Arena (1,423); Edwardsville, IL
January 25, 2025; 3:30 PM, ESPN+		Morehead State	W 65–54	14–7 (7–3)	22 – R. Taylor	8 – Thompson	3 – B. Taylor	First Community Arena (1,818); Edwardsville, IL
January 30, 2025; 7:30 PM, ESPN+		Lindenwood	L 63–65	14–8 (7–4)	19 – R. Taylor	13 – Malith	5 – B. Taylor	Hyland Performance Arena (1,489); St. Charles, MO
February 1, 2025; 3:30 PM, ESPN+		Western Illinois	W 69–65	15–8 (8–4)	23 – R. Taylor	11 – Thomas	4 – R. Taylor	Western Hall (1,083); Macomb, IL
February 4, 2025; 7:30 PM, ESPN+		Eastern Illinois	W 66–41	16–8 (9–4)	15 – Thompson	14 – Malith	6 – B. Taylor	First Community Arena (1,415); Edwardsville, IL
February 6, 2025; 7:30 PM, ESPN+		Tennessee Tech	W 75–58	17–8 (10–4)	28 – R. Taylor	14 – Malith	5 – R. Taylor	Eblen Center; Cookeville, TN
February 13, 2025; 7:30 PM, ESPN+		UT Martin	L 71–76	17–9 (10–5)	22 – Malith	9 – Thomas	7 – R. Taylor	First Community Arena (1,501); Edwardsville, IL
February 15, 2025; 3:30 PM, ESPN+		Tennessee State	W 84–72	18–9 (11–5)	22 – B. Taylor	8 – B. Taylor	8 – R. Taylor	First Community Arena (2,112); Edwardsville, IL
February 20, 2025; 6:30 PM, ESPN+		Morehead State	W 80–62	19–9 (12–5)	33 – R. Taylor	7 – R. Taylor	4 – B. Taylor	Ellis Johnson Arena (1,545); Morehead, KY
February 22, 2025; 7:30 PM, ESPN+		Southern Indiana	L 68–82	19–10 (12–6)	18 – R. Taylor	6 – Tied	4 – R. Taylor	Liberty Arena; Evansville, IN
February 27, 2025; 7:30 PM, ESPN+		Southeast Missouri State	L 68–83	19–11 (12–7)	30 – R. Taylor	12 – Malith	2 – 3 Tied	First Community Arena (2,503); Edwardsville, IL
March 1, 2025; 3:30 PM, ESPN+		Little Rock	W 73–65	20–11 (13–7)	21 – Malith	7 – Malith	5 – Tied	First Community Arena (2,751); Edwardsville, IL
OVC Tournament
March 7, 2025; 9:30 PM, ESPNU&ESPN+	(2)	vs. (3) Tennessee State; Semifinals	W 71–69	21–11	24 – R. Taylor	6 – Tied	5 – B. Taylor	Ford Center (1,353); Evansville, IN
March 8, 2025; 8:00 PM, ESPN2&ESPN+	(2)	vs. (1) Southeast Missouri State; Finals	W 69–48	22–11	20 – R. Taylor	7 – 4 Tied	4 – R. Taylor	Ford Center; Evansville, IN
NCAA Tournament
March 20, 2025*; 1:00 PM, TBS	(16 MW)	vs. (1 MW) No. 2 Houston; First Round	L 40–78	22–12	10 – 2 Tied	5 – R. Taylor	3 – Dillon	Intrust Bank Arena (14,355); Wichita, KS
*Non-conference game. ^{#}Rankings from AP Poll. (#) Tournament seedings in parentheses. MW=Midwest. All times are in Central Time.
