= List of Morehead State Eagles men's basketball head coaches =

The following is a list of Morehead State Eagles men's basketball head coaches. There have been 15 head coaches of the Eagles in their 95-season history.

Morehead State's current head coach is Jonathan Mattox. He was hired as the Eagles' head coach in April 2024, replacing Preston Spradlin, who departed from the program to coach at James Madison University.

No.	Tenure	Coach	Years	Record	Pct.
1	1929–1936	George Downing	7	51–45	.531
2	1936–1943; 1945–1953	Ellis T. Johnson	15	179–161	.526
3	1943–1945	Len Miller	2	26–10	.722
4	1953–1965	Bobby Laughlin	12	166–120	.580
5	1965–1969	Bob Wright	4	58–38	.604
6	1969–1974	Bill Harrell	5	68–59	.535
7	1974–1978	Jack Schalow	4	45–56	.446
8	1978–1987	Wayne Martin	9	130–120	.520
9	1987–1991	Tommy Gaither	4	52–64	.448
10	1991–1997	Dick Fick	6	64–101	.388
11	1997–2006	Kyle Macy	9	105–145	.420
12	2006–2012	Donnie Tyndall	6	114–85	.573
13	2012–2016 (Note: Woods resigned on December 15, 2016 after an investigation into alleged abuse of his players. Preston Spradlin served as interim head coach for the remainder of the 2016–17 season.)	Sean Woods	5	77–70	.524
14	2016–2024 (Note: After serving as interim head coach for the end of the 2016–17 season, Spradlin was named permanent head coach in March 2017.)	Preston Spradlin	7	140–109	.562
15	2024–present	Jonathan Mattox	1	0–0	–
Totals		15 coaches	95 seasons	1,275–1,182	.519
Records updated through end of 2023–24 season Source
