= 2024–25 Tennessee State Tigers basketball team =

American college basketball season

2024–25 Tennessee State Tigers basketball
- Conference: Ohio Valley Conference
- Record: 17–16 (12–8 OVC)
- Head coach: Brian Collins (7th season)
- Assistant coaches: Jeremy Lewis; Joshua Bone Jr.; Erik Buggs; Brandon Lockridge
- Home arena: Gentry Center

2024–25 Ohio Valley Conference men's basketball standings
	Conf.				Overall
Team	W		L	PCT	W		L	PCT
Southeast Missouri State	15	–	5	.750	21	–	12	.636
SIU Edwardsville †	13	–	7	.650	22	–	12	.647
Tennessee State	12	–	8	.600	17	–	16	.515
Little Rock	12	–	8	.600	19	–	14	.576
Tennessee Tech	10	–	10	.500	15	–	17	.469
Lindenwood*	10	–	10	.500	16	–	17	.485
Morehead State	10	–	10	.500	15	–	17	.469
UT Martin	9	–	11	.450	14	–	19	.424
Eastern Illinois	8	–	12	.400	12	–	19	.387
Western Illinois	6	–	14	.300	12	–	19	.387
Southern Indiana*	5	–	15	.250	10	–	20	.333
† 2025 OVC tournament winner * ineligible for the 2025 NCAA tournament due to transition period

The 2024–25 Tennessee State Tigers basketball team represented Tennessee State University during the 2024–25 NCAA Division I men's basketball season. The Tigers, led by seventh-year head coach Brian Collins, played their home games at the Gentry Center in Nashville, Tennessee, as members of the Ohio Valley Conference.

== Previous season ==
The Tigers finished the 2023–24 season 18–15, 10–8 in OVC play to finish in fifth place. They defeated Southern Indiana, before falling to Western Illinois in the quarterfinals of the OVC tournament.

== Roster ==
2024–25 Tennessee State Tigers men's basketball team
Players
Coaches

Pos.	#	Name	Height	Weight	Year	Previous school	Hometown
G	0	Justus Jackson	6 ft 1 in (1.85 m)	175 lb (79 kg)	Jr	UT Martin	Surprise, Arizona
G	2	Travis Harper II	6 ft 6 in (1.98 m)	190 lb (86 kg)	RS Jr	Clayton State	Columbus, Georgia
G	3	Khalil London	6 ft 3 in (1.91 m)	185 lb (84 kg)	RS So	Charleston	Wyandanch, New York
F	4	JC Brooks	6 ft 10 in (2.08 m)	215 lb (98 kg)	Fr	Orangeville Prep	Calgary, Alberta
G	5	Maddux Bodenhamer	6 ft 2 in (1.88 m)	190 lb (86 kg)	Fr	Antioch High School	Nashville, Tennessee
G	10	Blake Fleming	6 ft 2 in (1.88 m)	195 lb (88 kg)	Fr	North Central High School	Indianapolis, Indiana
F	11	Antoine Lorick III	6 ft 8 in (2.03 m)	210 lb (95 kg)	So	Navarro College	Augusta, Georgia
F	12	Carlous Williams	6 ft 5 in (1.96 m)	230 lb (104 kg)	Sr	Tulsa	Hattiesburg, Mississippi
G/F	13	Louis Daoust	6 ft 7 in (2.01 m)	200 lb (91 kg)	So	Saint Rose	Montreal, Quebec
G	20	Brandon Weston	6 ft 5 in (1.96 m)	200 lb (91 kg)	RS Jr	Rhode Island	Brooklyn, New York
F	21	Ronald Jessamy	6 ft 8 in (2.03 m)	210 lb (95 kg)	So	Mount St. Mary's	Philadelphia, Pennsylvania
F	23	Kavien Jones	6 ft 7 in (2.01 m)	230 lb (104 kg)	Fr	Battle Ground Academy	Franklin, Tennessee
F	25	Ahmir Langlais	6 ft 9 in (2.06 m)	225 lb (102 kg)	GS	USC Upstate	Atlanta, Georgia
G	30	Aaron Nkrumah	6 ft 6 in (1.98 m)	175 lb (79 kg)	Jr	Worcester State	Worcester, Massachusetts
F	33	Josh Ogundele	7 ft 0 in (2.13 m)	275 lb (125 kg)	GS	Middle Tennessee	London, England
G	55	Knute Wood	6 ft 4 in (1.93 m)	191 lb (87 kg)	RS So	Brooks High School	Killen, Alabama

Head coach

- Brian Collins (Belmont)

Assistant coach(es)

- Jeremy Lewis (Cumberland)
- Joshua Bone Jr. (Tennessee)
- Erik Buggs (Valparaiso)
- Brandon Lockridge (Tennessee St.)

Legend

- (C) Team captain
- (S) Suspended
- (I) Ineligible
- (W) Walk-on
- Injured
- Current redshirt

Roster
Last update: November 28, 2024

== Schedule and results ==
Date time, TV	Rank^{#}	Opponent^{#}	Result	Record	Site (attendance) city, state
Non-conference regular season
November 4, 2024*; 7:30 pm, ESPN+		Fisk	W 96–66	1–0	Gentry Center; Nashville, TN
November 8, 2024*; 8:30 pm, MWN		at Colorado State	L 79–87 ^{OT}	1–1	Moby Arena (4,866); Fort Collins, CO
November 10, 2024*; 3:00 pm, MWN		at Wyoming	L 66–81	1–2	Arena-Auditorium (3,399); Laramie, WY
November 13, 2024*; 6:00 pm		vs. Howard; HBCU All Stars Challenge	L 84–88 ^{OT}	1–3	GSU Convocation Center; Atlanta, GA
November 16, 2024*; 7:00 pm, ESPN+		Alabama A&M	W 81–71	2–3	Gentry Center (995); Nashville, TN
November 19, 2024*; 6:00 pm, ESPN+		East–West	W 110–33	3–3	Gentry Center (163); Nashville, TN
November 25, 2024*; 6:00 pm, ESPN+		at Chattanooga; Coke Classic	L 78–85	3–4	McKenzie Arena (3,002); Chattanooga, TN
November 26, 2024*; 3:00 pm		vs. Bryant; Coke Classic	L 85–97	3–5	McKenzie Arena (268); Chattanooga, TN
December 1, 2024*; 1:00 pm, ESPN+		UNC Asheville	L 74–92	3–6	Gentry Center (125); Nashville, TN
December 10, 2024*; 7:00 pm, ESPN+		at Western Kentucky	L 60–84	3–7	E. A. Diddle Arena (2,312); Bowling Green, KY
December 14, 2024*; 2:00 pm, ESPN+		Johnson	W 89–58	4–7	Gentry Center (247); Nashville, TN
OVC regular season
December 19, 2024; 7:30 pm, ESPN+		at Southern Indiana	L 75–77	4–8 (0–1)	Liberty Arena (1,311); Evansville, IN
December 21, 2024; 3:30 pm, ESPN+		at Morehead State	L 68–74	4–9 (0–2)	Ellis Johnson Arena (1,076); Morehead, KY
January 2, 2025; 7:30 pm, ESPN+		Southeast Missouri State	L 65–67	4–10 (0–3)	Gentry Center (352); Nashville, TN
January 4, 2025; 3:30 pm, ESPN+		Little Rock	W 95–86	5–10 (1–3)	Gentry Center (376); Nashville, TN
January 9, 2025; 7:30 pm, ESPN+		at Lindenwood	L 62–72	5–11 (1–4)	Robert F. Hyland Arena (574); St. Charles, MO
January 11, 2025; 3:30 pm, ESPN+		at Western Illinois	W 72–52	6–11 (2–4)	Western Hall (589); Macomb, IL
January 16, 2025; 7:30 pm, ESPN+		SIU Edwardsville	L 80–87 ^{2OT}	6–12 (2–5)	Gentry Center (1,204); Nashville, TN
January 18, 2025; 3:30 pm, ESPN+		Eastern Illinois	W 84–65	7–12 (3–5)	Gentry Center; Nashville, TN
January 21, 2025; 7:30 pm, ESPN+		UT Martin	W 81–80 ^{OT}	8–12 (4–5)	Gentry Center (2,296); Nashville, TN
January 23, 2025; 7:30 pm, ESPN+		Tennessee Tech	W 89–77	9–12 (5–5)	Gentry Center (1,522); Nashville, TN
January 30, 2025; 7:00 pm, ESPN+		at Little Rock	W 72–70	10–12 (6–5)	Jack Stephens Center (1,530); Little Rock, AR
February 1, 2025; 4:00 pm, ESPN+		at Southeast Missouri State	L 87–89 ^{OT}	10–13 (6–6)	Show Me Center (2,379); Cape Girardeau, MO
February 6, 2025; 7:00 pm, ESPN+		Western Illinois	W 87–69	11–13 (7–6)	Gentry Center (1,870); Nashville, TN
February 8, 2025; 3:30 pm, ESPN+		Lindenwood	W 84–76	12–13 (8–6)	Gentry Center (895); Nashville, TN
February 13, 2025; 7:30 pm, ESPN+		at Eastern Illinois	W 66–49	13–13 (9–6)	Groniger Arena (1,075); Charleston, IL
February 15, 2025; 3:30 pm, ESPN+		at SIU Edwardsville	L 72–84	13–14 (9–7)	First Community Arena (2,112); Edwardsville, IL
February 18, 2025; 7:30 pm, ESPN+		at UT Martin	W 86–75	14–14 (10–7)	Skyhawk Arena (651); Martin, TN
February 22, 2025; 3:30 pm, ESPN+		at Tennessee Tech	L 74–77	14–15 (10–8)	Hooper Eblen Center (1,534); Cookeville, TN
February 27, 2025; 7:30 pm, ESPN+		Morehead State	W 64–55	15–15 (11–8)	Gentry Center (917); Nashville, TN
March 1, 2025; 3:30 pm, ESPN+		Southern Indiana	W 74–69	16–15 (12–8)	Gentry Center (810); Nashville, TN
OVC tournament
March 6, 2025; 8:30 pm, ESPN+	(3)	vs. (6) Lindenwood; Quarterfinals	W 69–55	17–15	Ford Center (1,011); Evansville, IN
March 7, 2025; 8:30 pm, ESPNU/ESPN+	(3)	vs. (2) SIU Edwardsville; Semifinals	L 69–71	17–16	Ford Center (1,353); Evansville, IN
*Non-conference game. ^{#}Rankings from AP Poll. (#) Tournament seedings in parentheses. All times are in Central.
