= 2024–25 UT Martin Skyhawks men's basketball team =

American college basketball season

2024–25 UT Martin Skyhawks men's basketball
- Conference: Ohio Valley Conference
- Record: 14–19 (9–11 OVC)
- Head coach: Jeremy Shulman (1st season)
- Assistant coaches: John Aiken; Mark White; Séllé Hann; Truman Moore; Jawaan Holmes Nick Johnson
- Home arena: Skyhawk Arena

2024–25 Ohio Valley Conference men's basketball standings
	Conf.				Overall
Team	W		L	PCT	W		L	PCT
Southeast Missouri State	15	–	5	.750	21	–	12	.636
SIU Edwardsville †	13	–	7	.650	22	–	12	.647
Tennessee State	12	–	8	.600	17	–	16	.515
Little Rock	12	–	8	.600	19	–	14	.576
Tennessee Tech	10	–	10	.500	15	–	17	.469
Lindenwood*	10	–	10	.500	16	–	17	.485
Morehead State	10	–	10	.500	15	–	17	.469
UT Martin	9	–	11	.450	14	–	19	.424
Eastern Illinois	8	–	12	.400	12	–	19	.387
Western Illinois	6	–	14	.300	12	–	19	.387
Southern Indiana*	5	–	15	.250	10	–	20	.333
† 2025 OVC tournament winner * ineligible for the 2025 NCAA tournament due to transition period

The 2024–25 UT Martin Skyhawks men's basketball team represented the University of Tennessee at Martin during the 2024–25 NCAA Division I men's basketball season. The Skyhawks, led by first-year head coach Jeremy Shulman, played their home games at Skyhawk Arena located in Martin, Tennessee as members of the Ohio Valley Conference.

== Previous season ==
The Skyhawks finished the 2023–24 season 21–11, 14–4 in OVC play, to finish in a three-way tie for first place. As the No. 2 seed in the OVC tournament, they were defeated by Morehead State in the semifinals.

Following the conclusion of the season, Skyhawks head coach Ryan Ridder resigned, and left the school to become the head coach at Mercer. On March 27, 2024, the school named Jeremy Shulman the team's next head coach.

== Roster ==
2024–25 UT Martin Skyhawks men's basketball team
Players
Coaches

Pos.	#	Name	Height	Weight	Year	Hometown
G/F	0	Andrija Bukumirović	6 ft 7 in (2.01 m)	200 lb (91 kg)	So	Sjenica, Serbia
G	1	Tarence Guinyard	6 ft 2 in (1.88 m)	170 lb (77 kg)	Jr	Tampa, Florida
G	2	AJ Murphy	6 ft 0 in (1.83 m)	155 lb (70 kg)	Fr	Johnson City, Tennessee
G	4	Afan Trnka	6 ft 2 in (1.88 m)	180 lb (82 kg)	So	Sarajevo, Bosnia and Herzegovina
F	5	David Kamwanga	6 ft 7 in (2.01 m)	220 lb (100 kg)	Sr	Kinshasa, DR Congo
G/F	6	Matija Žužić	6 ft 7 in (2.01 m)	195 lb (88 kg)	Jr	Belgrade, Serbia
F	7	Vladimer Salaridze	6 ft 7 in (2.01 m)	230 lb (104 kg)	RS Sr	Tbilisi, Georgia
G	9	Pedro Santos	6 ft 7 in (2.01 m)	200 lb (91 kg)	Fr	Porto, Portugal
G	10	Josué Grullon	6 ft 5 in (1.96 m)	195 lb (88 kg)	Jr	Santo Domingo, Dominican Republic
G/F	11	AJ Hopkins	6 ft 6 in (1.98 m)	195 lb (88 kg)	Jr	Atlanta, Georgia
G	15	Carlos Cortijo	6 ft 0 in (1.83 m)	165 lb (75 kg)	So	Canóvanas, Puerto Rico
G	22	Lucas Williams	6 ft 4 in (1.93 m)	185 lb (84 kg)	Fr	Altamonte Springs, Florida
F	23	Fabian Spee	6 ft 9 in (2.06 m)	190 lb (86 kg)	Fr	Gramsbergen, Netherlands
C	24	Damjan Vukčević	7 ft 1 in (2.16 m)	250 lb (113 kg)	Jr	Podgorica, Montenegro
F	25	Stefano Faloppa	6 ft 9 in (2.06 m)	235 lb (107 kg)	Jr	Portogruaro, Italy
G	33	Filip Radaković	6 ft 7 in (2.01 m)	200 lb (91 kg)	Fr	Belgrade, Serbia
F	34	Lamine Niang	6 ft 9 in (2.06 m)	230 lb (104 kg)	RS So	Thiès, Senegal

Head coach

- Jeremy Shulman (Middle Tennessee)

Assistant coach(es)

- John Aiken (Belhaven)
- Mark White (Austin Peay)
- Séllé Hann (Vanguard)
- Truman Moore (McNeese State)
- Jawaan Holmes (Fairmont State)
- Nick Johnson (North Florida)

Legend

- (C) Team captain
- (S) Suspended
- (I) Ineligible
- (W) Walk-on
- Injured
- Current redshirt

Roster
Last update: November 7, 2024

== Schedule and results ==
Date time, TV	Rank^{#}	Opponent^{#}	Result	Record	Site (attendance) city, state
Non-conference regular season
November 4, 2024*; 7:00 pm, ESPN+		at Illinois State	W 67–65	1–0	CEFCU Arena (3,854); Normal, IL
November 7, 2024*; 11:00 am, ESPN+		Kentucky Christian	W 114–61	2–0	Skyhawk Arena (2,762); Martin, TN
November 11, 2024*; 6:00 pm, ESPN+		at North Alabama	L 69–87	2–1	CB&S Bank Arena (2,212); Florence, AL
November 16, 2024*; 12:00 pm, ESPN+		at Longwood	L 62–64	2–2	Joan Perry Brock Center (1,473); Farmville, VA
November 21, 2024*; 7:00 pm, ESPN+		at Texas A&M–Corpus Christi; Island U Invitational	L 77–81	2–3	Dugan Wellness Center; Corpus Christi, TX
November 22, 2024*; 5:00 pm, ESPN+		vs. Le Moyne; Island U Invitational	L 53–65	2–4	Dugan Wellness Center (490); Corpus Christi, TX
November 27, 2024*; 3:00 pm, SECN+/ESPN+		at No. 7 Tennessee	L 35–78	2–5	Thompson–Boling Arena (17,314); Knoxville, TN
December 3, 2024*; 6:00 pm, ESPN+		at Charleston Southern	L 68–83	2–6	Buccaneer Field House (789); North Charleston, SC
December 7, 2024*; 4:00 pm, ESPN+		Montreat	W 112–60	3–6	Skyhawk Arena (1,069); Martin, TN
December 11, 2024*; 6:00 pm		at Alabama State	L 93–103 ^{OT}	3–7	Dunn–Oliver Acadome (550); Montgomery, AL
December 15, 2024*; 3:30 pm, ESPN+		Champion Christian	W 123–56	4–7	Skyhawk Arena (821); Martin, TN
OVC regular season
December 19, 2024; 6:30 pm, ESPN+		at Morehead State	L 69–70 ^{OT}	4–8 (0–1)	Ellis Johnson Arena (1,081); Morehead, KY
December 21, 2024; 3:30 pm, ESPN+		at Southern Indiana	W 77–46	5–8 (1–1)	Screaming Eagles Arena (1,652); Evansville, IN
January 2, 2025; 7:30 pm, ESPN+		Little Rock	L 56–57	5–9 (1–2)	Skyhawk Arena (1,131); Martin, TN
January 4, 2025; 3:30 pm, ESPN+		Southeast Missouri State	W 66–63	6–9 (2–2)	Skyhawk Arena (1,340); Martin, TN
January 9, 2025; 7:30 pm, ESPN+		at Western Illinois	W 85–83 ^{OT}	7–9 (3–2)	Western Hall (628); Macomb, IL
January 11, 2025; 3:30 pm, ESPN+		at Lindenwood	L 81–82	7–10 (3–3)	Hyland Performance Arena (1,028); St. Charles, MO
January 16, 2025; 7:30 pm, ESPN+		Eastern Illinois	W 68–63	8–10 (4–3)	Skyhawk Arena (1,579); Martin, TN
January 18, 2025; 3:30 pm, ESPN+		SIU Edwardsville	W 85–82	9–10 (5–3)	Skyhawk Arena (1,664); Martin, TN
January 21, 2025; 7:30 pm, ESPN+		at Tennessee State	L 80–81 ^{OT}	9–11 (5–4)	Gentry Complex (2,296); Nashville, TN
January 25, 2025; 3:30 pm, ESPN+		Tennessee Tech	L 85–89 ^{OT}	9–12 (5–5)	Skyhawk Arena (1,703); Martin, TN
January 30, 2025; 7:30 pm, ESPN+		at Southeast Missouri State	L 79–90	9–13 (5–6)	Show Me Center (1,849); Cape Girardeau, MO
February 1, 2025; 3:00 pm, ESPN+		at Little Rock	L 57–75	9–14 (5–7)	Jack Stephens Center (1,561); Little Rock, AR
February 6, 2025; 7:30 pm, ESPN+		Lindenwood	L 51–52	9–15 (5–8)	Skyhawk Arena (1,330); Martin, TN
February 8, 2025; 3:30 pm, ESPN+		Western Illinois	W 81–70	10–15 (6–8)	Skyhawk Arena (1,576); Martin, TN
February 13, 2025; 7:30 pm, ESPN+		at SIU Edwardsville	W 76–71	11–15 (7–8)	First Community Arena (1,501); Edwardsville, IL
February 15, 2025; 3:30 pm, ESPN+		at Eastern Illinois	W 72–68	12–15 (8–8)	Lantz Arena (1,041); Charleston, IL
February 18, 2025; 7:30 pm, ESPN+		Tennessee State	L 75–86	12–16 (8–9)	Skyhawk Arena (651); Martin, TN
February 20, 2025; 7:30 pm, ESPN+		at Tennessee Tech	L 66–71 ^{OT}	12–17 (8–10)	Eblen Center (1,143); Cookeville, TN
February 27, 2025; 7:30 pm, ESPN+		Southern Indiana	W 79–63	13–17 (9–10)	Skyhawk Arena (1,787); Martin, TN
March 1, 2025; 3:30 pm, ESPN+		Morehead State	L 47–59	13–18 (9–11)	Skyhawk Arena (1,487); Martin, TN
OVC tournament
March 5, 2025; 6:00 pm, ESPN+	(8)	vs. (5) Tennessee Tech; First round	W 70–67	14–18	Ford Center; Evansville, IN
March 6, 2025; 6:00 pm, ESPN+	(8)	vs. (4) Little Rock; Quarterfinals	L 77–82	14–19	Ford Center; Evansville, IN
*Non-conference game. ^{#}Rankings from AP Poll. (#) Tournament seedings in parentheses. All times are in Central.
