= 2024–25 Little Rock Trojans men's basketball team =

American college basketball season

2024–25 Little Rock Trojans men's basketball
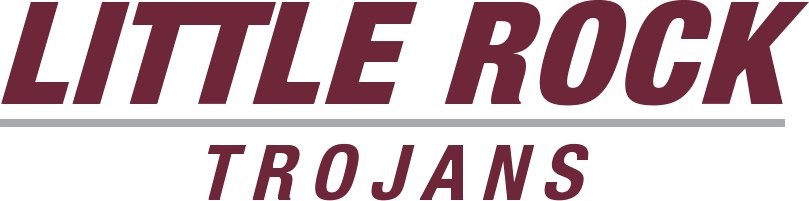
- Conference: Ohio Valley Conference
- Record: 19–14 (12–8 OVC)
- Head coach: Darrell Walker (7th season)
- Assistant coaches: Charles Baker; Charles Thomas; Evan Eustachy
- Home arena: Jack Stephens Center

2024–25 Ohio Valley Conference men's basketball standings
	Conf.				Overall
Team	W		L	PCT	W		L	PCT
Southeast Missouri State	15	–	5	.750	21	–	12	.636
SIU Edwardsville †	13	–	7	.650	22	–	12	.647
Tennessee State	12	–	8	.600	17	–	16	.515
Little Rock	12	–	8	.600	19	–	14	.576
Tennessee Tech	10	–	10	.500	15	–	17	.469
Lindenwood*	10	–	10	.500	16	–	17	.485
Morehead State	10	–	10	.500	15	–	17	.469
UT Martin	9	–	11	.450	14	–	19	.424
Eastern Illinois	8	–	12	.400	12	–	19	.387
Western Illinois	6	–	14	.300	12	–	19	.387
Southern Indiana*	5	–	15	.250	10	–	20	.333
† 2025 OVC tournament winner * ineligible for the 2025 NCAA tournament due to transition period

The 2024–25 Little Rock Trojans men's basketball team represented the University of Arkansas at Little Rock during the 2024–25 NCAA Division I men's basketball season. The Trojans, led by seventh-year head coach Darrell Walker, played their home games at the Jack Stephens Center in Little Rock, Arkansas as third-year members of the Ohio Valley Conference.

== Previous season ==
The Trojans finished the 2023–24 season 20–11, 14–4 in OVC play to finish in a three-way tie for first place. They qualified for the OVC Tournament as the No. 1 seed, defeating Western Illinois in the semifinals before falling to Morehead State in the championship match. The Trojans received an invitation to participate in the 2024 CBI, where they were defeated by Fairfield in the opening round.

== Roster ==
2024–25 Little Rock Trojans men's basketball team
Players
Coaches

Pos.	#	Name	Height	Weight	Year	Hometown
G	0	Christian Hughes	6 ft 2 in (1.88 m)	180 lb (82 kg)	RS Fr	Kirkwood, Missouri
G	1	Joseph Thomas	6 ft 3 in (1.91 m)	165 lb (75 kg)	Fr	Portal, Georgia
G	2	KK Robinson	6 ft 0 in (1.83 m)	180 lb (82 kg)	GS	Little Rock, Arkansas
G	3	Isaiah Lewis	6 ft 3 in (1.91 m)	165 lb (75 kg)	So	Los Angeles, California
F	4	Creed Williamson	6 ft 8 in (2.03 m)	230 lb (104 kg)	So	Little Rock, Arkansas
G	5	Mwani Wilkinson	6 ft 5 in (1.96 m)	205 lb (93 kg)	GS	Las Vegas, Nevada
G	7	Travonne Jackson	6 ft 7 in (2.01 m)	195 lb (88 kg)	RS Fr	Columbus, Ohio
F	10	Caleb Pennyfeather	6 ft 9 in (2.06 m)	196 lb (89 kg)	Fr	Orlando, Florida
G	11	Johnathan Lawson	6 ft 7 in (2.01 m)	190 lb (86 kg)	RS Jr	Memphis, Tennessee
G	12	Jordan Jefferson	6 ft 4 in (1.93 m)	180 lb (82 kg)	Sr	Marietta, Georgia
G	13	Kristiyan Popov	6 ft 7 in (2.01 m)	215 lb (98 kg)	So	Varna, Bulgaria
F	14	Charles Chukwu	6 ft 9 in (2.06 m)	235 lb (107 kg)	Jr	Katy, Texas
F	19	Nikola Milosevic	6 ft 11 in (2.11 m)	225 lb (102 kg)	So	Belgrade, Serbia
F	21	Ante Beljan	6 ft 8 in (2.03 m)	220 lb (100 kg)	RS So	Trogir, Croatia
F	32	Tuongthach Gatkek	6 ft 9 in (2.06 m)	187 lb (85 kg)	Sr	Portland, Maine

Head coach

- Darrell Walker (Arkansas)

Assistant coach(es)

- Charles Baker (Eastern Kentucky)
- Charles Thomas (Eastern Michigan)
- Evan Eustachy (Colorado State)

Legend

- (C) Team captain
- (S) Suspended
- (I) Ineligible
- (W) Walk-on
- Injured
- Current redshirt

Roster
Last update: November 16, 2024

== Schedule and results ==
Date time, TV	Rank^{#}	Opponent^{#}	Result	Record	High points	High rebounds	High assists	Site (attendance) city, state
Non-conference regular season
November 4, 2024*; 7:00 pm		Arkansas Baptist	W 84–64	1–0	21 – Wilkinson	9 – Wilkinson	5 – Lawson	Jack Stephens Center (1,179); Little Rock, AR
November 9, 2024*; 11:00 am, ESPN+		at Winthrop	L 67–82	1–1	27 – Lawson	8 – Lawson	4 – Beljan	Winthrop Coliseum (2,078); Rock Hill, SC
November 12, 2024*; 7:00 pm, ESPN+		at Arkansas State	L 63–80	1–2	20 – Wilkinson	6 – Tied	4 – Lewis	First National Bank Arena (5,187); Jonesboro, AR
November 16, 2024*; 3:00 pm, ESPN+		at UTSA	W 81–64	2–2	21 – Beljan	8 – Wilkinson	7 – Lewis	Convocation Center (858); San Antonio, TX
November 20, 2024*; 7:00 pm, ESPN+		at Tulsa	W 71–57	3–2	23 – Lawson	9 – Wilkinson	5 – Lawson	Reynolds Center (2,841); Tulsa, OK
November 22, 2024*; 8:00 pm, SECN		at No. 20 Arkansas; Turkey Throwdown	L 67–79	3–3	18 – Wilkinson	12 – Lawson	5 – Lawson	Bud Walton Arena (19,200); Fayetteville, AR
November 25, 2024*; 8:00 pm, BTN		at Illinois; Turkey Throwdown	L 34–92	3–4	11 – Jefferson	5 – Tied	3 – Lewis	State Farm Center (12,131); Champaign, IL
November 27, 2024*; 7:00 pm, ESPN+		Maryland Eastern Shore; Turkey Throwdown	W 78–59	4–4	16 – Lawson	10 – Wilkinson	6 – Lewis	Jack Stephens Center (865); Little Rock, AR
December 4, 2024*; 7:00 pm, ESPN+		Central Arkansas; I-40 Showdown	W 63–57	5–4	18 – Lawson	9 – Wilkinson	6 – Lawson	Jack Stephens Center (1,247); Little Rock, AR
December 10, 2023*; 7:00 pm, ESPN+		Ouachita Baptist	W 80–57	6–4	25 – Wilkinson	8 – Wilkinson	7 – Gatkek	Jack Stephens Center (920); Little Rock, AR
December 15, 2024*; 1:00 pm, ESPN+		UIC	L 69–77 ^{OT}	6–5	25 – Lawson	10 – Gatkek	5 – Gatkek	Jack Stephens Center (602); Little Rock, AR
OVC regular season
December 19, 2024; 6:30 pm, ESPN+		SIU Edwardsville	W 60–56	7–5 (1–0)	16 – Wilkinson	10 – Tied	7 – Lawson	Jack Stephens Center (820); Little Rock, AR
January 2, 2025; 7:30 pm, ESPN+		at UT Martin	W 57–56	8–5 (2–0)	14 – Lawson	10 – Gatkek	6 – Lewis	Skyhawk Arena (1,131); Martin, TN
January 4, 2025; 3:30 pm, ESPN+		at Tennessee State	L 86–95	8–6 (2–1)	33 – Beljan	11 – Beljan	6 – Lawson	Gentry Complex (376); Nashville, TN
January 9, 2025; 7:00 pm, ESPN+		Morehead State	L 53–59	8–7 (2–2)	14 – Lewis	9 – Tied	2 – Lawson	Jack Stephens Center (493); Little Rock, AR
January 12, 2025; 3:00 pm, ESPN+		Southern Indiana	W 78–58	9–7 (3–2)	24 – Beljan	10 – Lawson	6 – Lewis	Jack Stephens Center (771); Little Rock, AR
January 14, 2025; 7:30 pm, ESPN+		at Southeast Missouri State	W 73–71	10–7 (4–2)	28 – Lawson	7 – Tied	5 – Beljan	Show Me Center (2,585); Cape Girardeau, MO
January 18, 2025; 3:00 pm, ESPN+		at Tennessee Tech	W 77–71	11–7 (5–2)	22 – Beljan	10 – Wilkinson	6 – Lewis	Eblen Center (1,151); Cookeville, TN
January 23, 2025; 7:30 pm, ESPN+		at Western Illinois	W 62–51	12–7 (6–2)	25 – Lawson	12 – Wilkinson	5 – Lewis	Western Hall (743); Macomb, IL
January 25, 2025; 3:30 pm, ESPN+		at Lindenwood	W 78–46	13–7 (7–2)	19 – Wilkinson	14 – Gatkek	7 – Lawson	Hyland Performance Arena (701); St. Charles, MO
January 27, 2025; 2:00 pm, ESPN+		vs. Eastern Illinois; Rescheduled from Dec. 21	L 54–56	13–8 (7–3)	14 – Beljan	10 – Gatkek	4 – Tied	Hyland Performance Arena (52); St. Charles, MO
January 30, 2025; 7:00 pm, ESPN+		Tennessee State	L 70–72	13–9 (7–4)	20 – Lewis	7 – Beljan	5 – Beljan	Jack Stephens Center (1,530); Little Rock, AR
February 1, 2025; 3:00 pm, ESPN+		UT Martin	W 75–57	14–9 (8–4)	20 – Gatkek	12 – Gatkek	5 – Tied	Jack Stephens Center (1,561); Little Rock, AR
February 6, 2025; 7:30 pm, ESPN+		at Southern Indiana	W 74–56	15–9 (9–4)	19 – Lawson	12 – Wilkinson	4 – Wilkinson	Screaming Eagles Arena (1,438); Evansville, IN
February 8, 2025; 2:30 pm, ESPN+		at Morehead State	W 76–62	16–9 (10–4)	24 – Lawson	8 – Wilkinson	5 – Gatkek	Ellis Johnson Arena (1,956); Morehead, KY
February 11, 2025; 7:00 pm, ESPN+		Southeast Missouri State	L 45–57	16–10 (10–5)	15 – Lawson	7 – Wilkinson	4 – Lawson	Jack Stephens Center (1,286); Little Rock, AR
February 13, 2025; 7:00 pm, ESPN+		Tennessee Tech	W 79–75	17–10 (11–5)	17 – Tied	9 – Wilkinson	2 – Tied	Jack Stephens Center (1,237); Little Rock, AR
February 20, 2025; 7:00 pm, ESPN+		Lindenwood	L 92–93 ^{OT}	17–11 (11–6)	22 – Lawson	7 – Lawson	5 – Tied	Jack Stephens Center (1,125); Little Rock, AR
February 22, 2025; 3:00 pm, ESPN+		at Western Illinois	W 75–61	18–11 (12–6)	25 – Jefferson	12 – Gatkek	6 – Lawson	Jack Stephens Center (2,047); Little Rock, AR
February 27, 2025; 7:30 pm, ESPN+		at Eastern Illinois	L 60–71	18–12 (12–7)	15 – Jefferson	8 – Wilkinson	3 – Lawson	Lantz Arena (1,367); Charleston, IL
March 1, 2025; 3:30 pm, ESPN+		at SIU Edwardsville	L 65–73	18–13 (12–8)	21 – Jefferson	9 – Lewis	3 – Tied	First Community Arena (2,751); Edwardsville, IL
OVC Tournament
March 6, 2025; 6:00 pm, ESPN+	(4)	vs. (8) UT Martin; Quarterfinals	W 82–77	19–13	29 – Wilkinson	11 – Gatkek	8 – Lawson	Ford Center; Evansville, IN
March 7, 2025; 7:00 pm, ESPNU	(4)	vs. (1) Southeast Missouri State; Semifinals	L 59–78	19–14	20 – Williamson	5 – Williamson	2 – Tied	Ford Center; Evansville, IN
*Non-conference game. ^{#}Rankings from AP Poll. (#) Tournament seedings in parentheses. All times are in Central.
