= 2024–25 Lindenwood Lions men's basketball team =

American college basketball season

2024–25 Lindenwood Lions men's basketball
- Conference: Ohio Valley Conference
- Record: 16–17 (10–10 OVC)
- Head coach: Kyle Gerdeman (6th season)
- Associate head coach: Anthony Beane
- Assistant coaches: Kyle Campbell; Justin Walker; Jestin Anderson
- Home arena: Robert F. Hyland Arena

2024–25 Ohio Valley Conference men's basketball standings
	Conf.				Overall
Team	W		L	PCT	W		L	PCT
Southeast Missouri State	15	–	5	.750	21	–	12	.636
SIU Edwardsville †	13	–	7	.650	22	–	12	.647
Tennessee State	12	–	8	.600	17	–	16	.515
Little Rock	12	–	8	.600	19	–	14	.576
Tennessee Tech	10	–	10	.500	15	–	17	.469
Lindenwood*	10	–	10	.500	16	–	17	.485
Morehead State	10	–	10	.500	15	–	17	.469
UT Martin	9	–	11	.450	14	–	19	.424
Eastern Illinois	8	–	12	.400	12	–	19	.387
Western Illinois	6	–	14	.300	12	–	19	.387
Southern Indiana*	5	–	15	.250	10	–	20	.333
† 2025 OVC tournament winner * ineligible for the 2025 NCAA tournament due to transition period

The 2024–25 Lindenwood Lions men's basketball team represented Lindenwood University during the 2024–25 NCAA Division I men's basketball season. The Lions, led by sixth-year head coach Kyle Gerdeman, played their home games at the Robert F. Hyland Arena in St. Charles, Missouri as members of the Ohio Valley Conference (OVC).

This season marked Lindenwood's third year of a four-year transition period from Division II to Division I. As a result, the Lions were not eligible for NCAA postseason play until the 2026–27 season.

== Previous season ==
The Lions finished the 2023–24 season 9–22, 3–15 in OVC play to finish in last place. They failed to qualify for the OVC tournament, as only the top eight teams qualify.

== Roster ==
2024–25 Lindenwood Lions men's basketball team
Players
Coaches

Pos.	#	Name	Height	Weight	Year	Hometown
G	0	RJ Horry	5 ft 9 in (1.75 m)	—	So	O'Fallon, MO
G	1	Colin Ruffin	6 ft 4 in (1.93 m)	193 lb (88 kg)	So	Nixa, MO
G	2	Reggie Bass	6 ft 3 in (1.91 m)	190 lb (86 kg)	Jr	Muncie, IN
G	3	Markeith II Browning	6 ft 4 in (1.93 m)	200 lb (91 kg)	GS	Ypsilanti, MI
F	4	Jordan Wildy	6 ft 9 in (2.06 m)	220 lb (100 kg)	RS Jr	Rock Hill, SC
F	5	Jaylon McDaniel	6 ft 7 in (2.01 m)	240 lb (109 kg)	Sr	Kansas City, MO
G	8	Grant Redd	5 ft 9 in (1.75 m)	170 lb (77 kg)	Fr	Kansas City, MO
G	10	Jadis Jones	6 ft 5 in (1.96 m)	200 lb (91 kg)	Fr	New Madrid, MO
G	11	Jalen Bouknight	6 ft 0 in (1.83 m)	175 lb (79 kg)	RS So	Odenton, MD
G	12	Anias Futrell	6 ft 5 in (1.96 m)	185 lb (84 kg)	Sr	St. Louis, MO
F	13	Aly Tounkara	7 ft 0 in (2.13 m)	215 lb (98 kg)	Fr	Conakry, Guinea
G	15	Nathan Jr. Johnson	6 ft 3 in (1.91 m)	210 lb (95 kg)	Sr	Kansas City, KS
F	21	Alex Nokes	6 ft 8 in (2.03 m)	230 lb (104 kg)	RS Fr	Pacific Palisades, CA
G/F	24	Jeremiah Talton	6 ft 6 in (1.98 m)	210 lb (95 kg)	Jr	Quincy, IL
F	33	Beren Demer Ozdemir	6 ft 9 in (2.06 m)	215 lb (98 kg)	Fr	Istanbul, Turkey
G	34	Clayton Jackson	6 ft 2 in (1.88 m)	180 lb (82 kg)	Fr	St. Louis, MO

Head coach

- Kyle Gerdeman (Southeast Missouri State)

Assistant coach(es)

- Anthony Beane (Kansas State)
- Kyle Campbell (Hastings)
- Justin Walker (Eastern Illinois)
- Jestin Anderson (Quincy)

Legend

- (C) Team captain
- (S) Suspended
- (I) Ineligible
- (W) Walk-on
- Injured
- Current redshirt

Roster
Last update: November 29, 2024

== Schedule and results ==
Date time, TV	Rank^{#}	Opponent^{#}	Result	Record	Site (attendance) city, state
Exhibition
October 29, 2024*; 7:00 p.m.		Hannibal–LaGrange	W 81–45	–	Robert F. Hyland Arena (217); St. Charles, MO
Non-conference regular season
November 4, 2024*; 8:00 p.m., SECN+/ESPN+		at Oklahoma	L 60–93	0–1	Lloyd Noble Center (4,886); Norman, OK
November 7, 2024*; 6:00 p.m., ESPN+		UHSP	W 98–30	1–1	Robert F. Hyland Arena (413); St. Charles, MO
November 14, 2024*; 3:00 p.m., ESPN+		vs. New Orleans; Urban-Bennett Invitational	L 74–82	1–2	UPMC Events Center; Moon Township, PA
November 15, 2024*; 6:00 p.m., ESPN+		at Robert Morris; Urban-Bennett Invitational	L 53–67	1–3	UPMC Events Center (678); Moon Township, PA
November 17, 2024*; 12:00 p.m., ESPN+		vs. Stonehill; Urban-Bennett Invitational	W 75–74	2–3	UPMC Events Center; Moon Township, PA
November 21, 2024*; 7:00 p.m., ESPN+		at Valparaiso	L 64–77	2–4	Athletics–Recreation Center (1,249); Valparaiso, IN
November 27, 2024*; 5:30 p.m., SECN+/ESPN+		at Missouri	L 61–81	2–5	Mizzou Arena (9,298); Columbia, MO
December 4, 2024*; 6:00 p.m., ESPN+		East–West	W 102–45	3–5	Robert F. Hyland Arena (457); St. Charles, MO
December 7, 2024*; 7:00 p.m., SECN+/ESPN+		at No. 23 Ole Miss	L 53–86	3–6	SJB Pavilion (7,106); Oxford, MS
December 10, 2024*; 6:00 p.m., ESPN+		Harris–Stowe State	W 99–53	4–6	Robert F. Hyland Arena (452); St. Charles, MO
December 14, 2024*; 3:30 p.m., ESPN+		IU Indy	W 81–63	5–6	Robert F. Hyland Arena (610); St. Charles, MO
OVC regular season
December 19, 2024; 7:30 p.m., ESPN+		Tennessee Tech	L 73–79	5–7 (0–1)	Robert F. Hyland Arena (676); St. Charles, MO
December 21, 2024; 3:30 p.m., ESPN+		Western Illinois	W 71–65	6–7 (1–1)	Robert F. Hyland Arena (1,001); St. Charles, MO
January 2, 2025; 7:30 p.m., ESPN+		at Eastern Illinois	L 74–78 ^{OT}	6–8 (1–2)	Groniger Arena (735); Charleston, IL
January 4, 2025; 3:30 p.m., ESPN+		at SIU Edwardsville	L 47–58	6–9 (1–3)	First Community Arena (1,347); Edwardsville, IL
January 9, 2025; 7:30 p.m., ESPN+		Tennessee State	W 72–62	7–9 (2–3)	Robert F. Hyland Arena (574); St. Charles, MO
January 11, 2025; 3:30 p.m., ESPN+		UT Martin	W 82–81	8–9 (3–3)	Robert F. Hyland Arena (1,028); St. Charles, MO
January 16, 2025; 7:30 p.m., ESPN+		at Southern Indiana	L 73–80	8–10 (3–4)	Liberty Arena (1,669); Evansville, IN
January 18, 2025; 2:30 p.m., ESPN+		at Morehead State	L 65–82	8–11 (3–5)	Ellis Johnson Arena (1,554); Morehead, KY
January 23, 2025; 7:30 p.m., ESPN+		Southeast Missouri State	W 72–68	9–11 (4–5)	Robert F. Hyland Arena (1,989); St. Charles, MO
January 25, 2025; 3:30 p.m., ESPN+		Little Rock	L 46–78	9–12 (4–6)	Robert F. Hyland Arena (701); St. Charles, MO
January 30, 2025; 7:30 p.m., ESPN+		SIU Edwardsville	W 65–63	10–12 (5–6)	Robert F. Hyland Arena (1,489); St. Charles, MO
February 1, 2025; 3:30 p.m., ESPN+		Eastern Illinois	L 70–76	10–13 (5–7)	Robert F. Hyland Arena (1,194); St. Charles, MO
February 6, 2025; 7:30 p.m., ESPN+		at UT Martin	W 52–51	11–13 (6–7)	Skyhawk Arena (1,330); Martin, TN
February 8, 2025; 3:30 p.m., ESPN+		at Tennessee State	L 76–84	11–14 (6–8)	Gentry Center (895); Nashville, TN
February 13, 2025; 7:30 p.m., ESPN+		Morehead State	W 73–60	12–14 (7–8)	Robert F. Hyland Arena (1,131); St. Charles, MO
February 15, 2025; 3:30 p.m., ESPN+		Southern Indiana	W 81–78 ^{OT}	13–14 (8–8)	Robert F. Hyland Arena (1,837); St. Charles, MO
February 20, 2025; 7:00 p.m., ESPN+		at Little Rock	W 93–92 ^{OT}	14–14 (9–8)	Jack Stephens Center (1,125); Little Rock, AR
February 22, 2025; 3:45 p.m., ESPN+		at Southeast Missouri State	L 58–74	14–15 (9–9)	Show Me Center (3,920); Cape Girardeau, MO
February 25, 2025; 7:30 p.m., ESPN+		at Western Illinois	L 81–86 ^{OT}	14–16 (9–10)	Western Hall (729); Macomb, IL
March 1, 2025; 3:00 p.m., ESPN+		at Tennessee Tech	W 76–74	15–16 (10–10)	Hooper Eblen Center (1,789); Cookeville, TN
OVC tournament
March 5, 2025; 8:30 p.m., ESPN+	(6)	vs. (7) Morehead State; First round	W 73–65	16–16	Ford Center (797); Evansville, IN
March 6, 2025; 8:30 p.m., ESPN+	(6)	vs. (3) Tennessee State; Quarterfinals	L 55–69	16–17	Ford Center (1,011); Evansville, IN
*Non-conference game. ^{#}Rankings from AP poll. (#) Tournament seedings in parentheses. All times are in Central.
