= 2024–25 Southeast Missouri State Redhawks men's basketball team =

American college basketball season

2024–25 Southeast Missouri State Redhawks men's basketball

Ohio Valley regular season champions
- Conference: Ohio Valley Conference
- Record: 21–12 (15–5 OVC)
- Head coach: Brad Korn (5th season)
- Associate head coach: J.R. Reynolds
- Assistant coaches: LaDon Champagnie; DJ Byrd; Ryan Strohm
- Home arena: Show Me Center

2024–25 Ohio Valley Conference men's basketball standings
	Conf.				Overall
Team	W		L	PCT	W		L	PCT
Southeast Missouri State	15	–	5	.750	21	–	12	.636
SIU Edwardsville †	13	–	7	.650	22	–	12	.647
Tennessee State	12	–	8	.600	17	–	16	.515
Little Rock	12	–	8	.600	19	–	14	.576
Tennessee Tech	10	–	10	.500	15	–	17	.469
Lindenwood*	10	–	10	.500	16	–	17	.485
Morehead State	10	–	10	.500	15	–	17	.469
UT Martin	9	–	11	.450	14	–	19	.424
Eastern Illinois	8	–	12	.400	12	–	19	.387
Western Illinois	6	–	14	.300	12	–	19	.387
Southern Indiana*	5	–	15	.250	10	–	20	.333
† 2025 OVC tournament winner * ineligible for the 2025 NCAA tournament due to transition period

The 2024–25 Southeast Missouri State Redhawks men's basketball team represented Southeast Missouri State University during the 2024–25 NCAA Division I men's basketball season. The Redhawks, led by fifth-year head coach Brad Korn, played their home games at the Show Me Center located in Cape Girardeau, Missouri as members of the Ohio Valley Conference.

== Previous season ==
The Redhawks finished the 2023–24 season 9–22, 4– 14 in OVC play to finish in tenth place. They failed to qualify for the OVC Tournament.

== Roster ==
2024–25 Southeast Missouri State Redhawks men's basketball team
Players
Coaches

Pos.	#	Name	Height	Weight	Year	Hometown
G	1	Rob Martin	5 ft 10 in (1.78 m)	170 lb (77 kg)	Jr	St. Louis, Missouri
G	2	BJ Ward	6 ft 0 in (1.83 m)	195 lb (88 kg)	So	St. Louis, Missouri
G	3	Demarion Walkup	6 ft 3 in (1.91 m)	195 lb (88 kg)	So	Bowling Green, Kentucky
G	4	Trey Cole Jr.	6 ft 5 in (1.96 m)	200 lb (91 kg)	Jr	Donaldsonville, Louisiana
G	5	TJ Biel	6 ft 7 in (2.01 m)	205 lb (93 kg)	Sr	Calgary, Alberta
G	10	Teddy Washington Jr.	6 ft 2 in (1.88 m)	175 lb (79 kg)	Sr	Blytheville, Arkansas
F	15	Brendan Terry	6 ft 7 in (2.01 m)	215 lb (98 kg)	Jr	Santa Monica, California
C	18	David Idada	7 ft 0 in (2.13 m)	265 lb (120 kg)	Jr	Barendrecht, Netherlands
F	22	Saxton Hoepker	6 ft 8 in (2.03 m)	215 lb (98 kg)	Jr	Nashville, Illinois
G	25	Jay Reynolds	6 ft 4 in (1.93 m)	190 lb (86 kg)	Fr	Cape Girardeau, Missouri
F	30	Elliot Lowndes	7 ft 0 in (2.13 m)	220 lb (100 kg)	Jr	Carbondale, Illinois
C	35	Mason Hanback	7 ft 0 in (2.13 m)	255 lb (116 kg)	Jr	Jackson, Tennessee
G	44	Braxton Stacker	6 ft 5 in (1.96 m)	205 lb (93 kg)	Jr	Fairview Heights, Illinois
G	55	Marqueas Bell	6 ft 3 in (1.91 m)	185 lb (84 kg)	So	Kansas City, Missouri

Head coach

- Brad Korn (Southern Illinois)

Assistant coach(es)

- J.R. Reynolds (Eastern Illinois)
- LaDon Champagnie (Missouri Baptist)
- DJ Byrd (Purdue)
- Ryan Strohm (Greenville University)

Legend

- (C) Team captain
- (S) Suspended
- (I) Ineligible
- (W) Walk-on
- Injured
- Current redshirt

Roster
Last update: November 10, 2024

== Schedule and results ==
Date time, TV	Rank^{#}	Opponent^{#}	Result	Record	Site (attendance) city, state
Regular season
November 4, 2024*; 7:00 pm, ESPN+		at Bradley	L 60–88	0–1	Carver Arena (5,014); Peoria, IL
November 10, 2024*; 12:00 pm, SECN+/ESPN+		at Vanderbilt	L 76–85	0–2	Memorial Gymnasium (5,700); Nashville, TN
November 13, 2024*; 6:30 pm, ESPN+		Crowley's Ridge	W 93–38	1–2	Show Me Center (745); Cape Girardeau, MO
November 17, 2024*; 2:00 pm, ESPN+		Chattanooga	L 82–87	1–3	Show Me Center (580); Cape Girardeau, MO
November 21, 2024*; 6:30 pm, ESPN+		at Central Arkansas	W 77–73 ^{OT}	2–3	Farris Center (1,311); Conway, AR
November 22, 2024*; 6:30 pm		vs. UNC Asheville	L 64–72	2–4	Farris Center (125); Conway, AR
November 30, 2024*; 7:30 pm, ESPN+		Kansas City	W 80–59	3–4	Show Me Center (890); Cape Girardeau, MO
December 5, 2024*; 11:00 am, ESPN+		at Lipscomb	L 60–78	3–5	Allen Arena (2,123); Nashville, TN
December 8, 2024*; 3:00 pm, ESPN+		at Murray State	L 53–73	3–6	CFSB Center (4,795); Murray, KY
December 15, 2024*; 2:00 pm, ESPN+		Saint Mary-of-the-Woods	W 93–56	4–6	Show Me Center (630); Cape Girardeau, MO
December 19, 2024; 7:30 pm, ESPN+		Eastern Illinois	W 79–72	5–6 (1–0)	Show Me Center (840); Cape Girardeau, MO
December 21, 2024; 3:45 pm, ESPN+		SIU Edwardsville	W 80–64	6–6 (2–0)	Show Me Center (1,123); Cape Girardeau, MO
December 29, 2024*; 2:00 pm, ESPN+		Westminster (MO)	W 88–39	7–6	Show Me Center (682); Cape Girardeau, MO
January 2, 2024; 7:30 pm, ESPN+		at Tennessee State	W 67–65	8–6 (3–0)	Gentry Complex (352); Nashville, TN
January 4, 2025; 3:30 pm, ESPN+		at UT Martin	L 63–66	8–7 (3–1)	Skyhawk Arena (1,340); Martin, TN
January 9, 2025; 7:30 pm, ESPN+		Southern Indiana	W 77–66	9–7 (4–1)	Show Me Center (805); Cape Girardeau, MO
January 11, 2025; 3:45 pm, ESPN+		Morehead State	L 56–67	9–8 (4–2)	Show Me Center (1,216); Cape Girardeau, MO
January 14, 2025; 7:30 pm, ESPN+		Little Rock	L 71–73	9–9 (4–3)	Show Me Center (2,585); Cape Girardeau, MO
January 16, 2025; 7:30 pm, ESPN+		at Tennessee Tech	W 77–70	10–9 (5–3)	Eblen Center (1,445); Cookeville, TN
January 23, 2025; 7:30 pm, ESPN+		at Lindenwood	L 68–72	10–10 (5–4)	Hyland Performance Arena (1,989); St. Charles, MO
January 25, 2025; 3:30 pm, ESPN+		at Western Illinois	W 72–51	11–10 (6–4)	Western Hall (696); Macomb, IL
January 30, 2025; 7:30 pm, ESPN+		UT Martin	W 90–79	12–10 (7–4)	Show Me Center (1,849); Cape Girardeau, MO
February 1, 2025; 3:45 pm, ESPN+		Tennessee State	W 89–87 ^{OT}	13–10 (8–4)	Show Me Center (2,379); Cape Girardeau, MO
February 6, 2025; 6:30 pm, ESPN+		at Morehead State	W 80–51	14–10 (9–4)	Ellis Johnson Arena (2,345); Morehead, KY
February 8, 2025; 7:30 pm, ESPN+		at Southern Indiana	W 79–74	15–10 (10–4)	Screaming Eagles Arena (3,097); Evansville, IN
February 11, 2025; 7:00 pm, ESPN+		at Little Rock	W 57–45	16–10 (11–4)	Jack Stephens Center; Little Rock, AR
February 15, 2025; 3:45 pm, ESPN+		Tennessee Tech	W 83–69	17–10 (12–4)	Show Me Center (2,692); Cape Girardeau, MO
February 20, 2025; 7:30 pm, ESPN+		Western Illinois	W 87–66	18–10 (13–4)	Show Me Center (2,237); Cape Girardeau, MO
February 22, 2025; 3:45 pm, ESPN+		Lindenwood	W 74–58	19–10 (14–4)	Show Me Center (3,920); Cape Girardeau, MO
February 27, 2025; 7:30 pm, ESPN+		at SIU Edwardsville	W 83–68	20–10 (15–4)	First Community Arena (2,503); Edwardsville, IL
March 1, 2025; 3:30 pm, ESPN+		at Eastern Illinois	L 58–73	20–11 (15–5)	Lantz Arena (1,632); Charleston, IL
Ohio Valley Tournament
March 7, 2025; 7:00 pm, ESPNU	(1)	vs. (4) Little Rock; Semifinals	W 78–59	21–11	Ford Center; Evansville, IN
March 8, 2025; 8:00 pm, ESPN2	(1)	vs. (2) SIU Edwardsville; Championship	L 48–69	21–12	Ford Center; Evansville, IN
*Non-conference game. ^{#}Rankings from AP Poll. (#) Tournament seedings in parentheses. All times are in Central.
