= Chad Boudreau =

American basketball coach (born 1972)

Current position
- Title: Head coach
- Team: Western Illinois
- Conference: OVC
- Record: 40–63 (.388)

Biographical details
- Born: October 23, 1972 (age 54)
- Education: Hannibal-LaGrange (BA, '95); Southwest Baptist (M.Ed, '99)

Coaching career (HC unless noted)
- 1995: Hannibal-LaGrange (women's GA)
- 1999–2005: Indian Hills (assistant)
- 2005–2016: Milwaukee (assistant)
- 2016–2017: Wisconsin-Whitewater (assistant)
- 2017–2020: Highland Community College
- 2020–2023: Western Illinois (associate HC)
- 2023–present: Western Illinois

Head coaching record
- Overall: 40–63 (.388) (NCAA); 76–21 (.784) (NJCAA)

Accomplishments and honors

Championships
- 3x Arrowhead Conference Regular Season (2018-20)

Records
- Region IV NJCAA (8-1), NJCAA D4 (0-1) NJCAA D1 (0-1)

Michael Chad Boudreau (born October 23, 1972) is an American college basketball coach and is currently the head coach of the Western Illinois Leathernecks men's basketball team.

== Coaching career ==
Boudreau began his coaching career as a graduate assistant for the women's basketball team at Hannibal-LaGrange College, and would later become an assistant coach for the men's basketball team at Indian Hills Community College from 1999 to 2005 before joining Rob Jeter's coaching staff at Milwaukee. He was on staff for the Panthers' upset of Oklahoma during the 2006 NCAA Tournament and was part of two Horizon League regular season titles and two tournament titles.

In 2016, Boudreau spent a single season as an assistant coach at Wisconsin-Whitewater before becoming the head coach at NJCAA institution Highland Community College. He'd guide the Cougars to three-straight Arrowhead Conference titles, and would compile a 76–21 overall record. In 2020, Boudreau would reunite with Jeter and join his staff at Western Illinois as associate head coach.

On April 13, 2023, Boudreau was promoted to head coach at Western Illinois when Jeter departed for the head coaching position at Southern Utah.

== Head coaching record ==
=== NCAA DI ===
Record table
Season	Team	Overall	Conference	Standing	Postseason
Western Illinois Leathernecks (Ohio Valley Conference) (2023–present)
2023–24	Western Illinois	21–12	13–5	4th	
2024–25	Western Illinois	12–19	6–14	10th	
2025–26	Western Illinois	5–26	1–19	11th	
2026–27	Western Illinois	2–6	0-0		
Western Illinois:		40–63 (.388)	20–38 (.345)		
Total:		40–63 (.388)			
National champion Postseason invitational champion Conference regular season champion Conference regular season and conference tournament champion Division regular season champion Division regular season and conference tournament champion Conference tournament champion

=== NJCAA ===
Record table
Season	Team	Overall	Conference	Standing	Postseason
Highland Community College Cougars (Arrowhead Conference) (2017–2020)
2017–18	Highland CC	26–8	10–1	1st	
2018–19	Highland CC	23–6	5–0	1st	
2019–20	Highland CC	27–7	10–0	1st	
Highland CC:		76–21 (.784)	25–1 (.962)		
Total:		76–21 (.784)			
National champion Postseason invitational champion Conference regular season champion Conference regular season and conference tournament champion Division regular season champion Division regular season and conference tournament champion Conference tournament champion
