= 2024–25 Tennessee Tech Golden Eagles men's basketball team =

American college basketball season

2024–25 Tennessee Tech Golden Eagles men's basketball
- Conference: Ohio Valley Conference
- Record: 15–17 (10–10 OVC)
- Head coach: John Pelphrey (6th season)
- Assistant coaches: Alex Fain; Blake Gray; Andrew Steele; Stefan King; Miloš Babić
- Home arena: Eblen Center

2024–25 Ohio Valley Conference men's basketball standings
	Conf.				Overall
Team	W		L	PCT	W		L	PCT
Southeast Missouri State	15	–	5	.750	21	–	12	.636
SIU Edwardsville †	13	–	7	.650	22	–	12	.647
Tennessee State	12	–	8	.600	17	–	16	.515
Little Rock	12	–	8	.600	19	–	14	.576
Tennessee Tech	10	–	10	.500	15	–	17	.469
Lindenwood*	10	–	10	.500	16	–	17	.485
Morehead State	10	–	10	.500	15	–	17	.469
UT Martin	9	–	11	.450	14	–	19	.424
Eastern Illinois	8	–	12	.400	12	–	19	.387
Western Illinois	6	–	14	.300	12	–	19	.387
Southern Indiana*	5	–	15	.250	10	–	20	.333
† 2025 OVC tournament winner * ineligible for the 2025 NCAA tournament due to transition period

The 2024–25 Tennessee Tech Golden Eagles men's basketball team represented Tennessee Technological University during the 2024–25 NCAA Division I men's basketball season. The Golden Eagles, led by sixth-year head coach John Pelphrey, played their home games at the Eblen Center located in Cookeville, Tennessee as members of the Ohio Valley Conference (OVC).

== Previous season ==
The Golden Eagles finished the 2023–24 season 10–21, 5–13 in OVC play, to finish tied for eighth place. They failed to qualify for the OVC tournament.

== Roster ==
2024–25 Tennessee Tech Golden Eagles men's basketball team
Players
Coaches

Pos.	#	Name	Height	Weight	Year	Hometown
F	0	Daniel Egbuniwe	6 ft 7 in (2.01 m)	210 lb (95 kg)	Jr	Memphis, TN
G	1	Mekhi Cameron	6 ft 4 in (1.93 m)	195 lb (88 kg)	Sr	Atlanta, GA
G	2	Kyle Layton	6 ft 0 in (1.83 m)	175 lb (79 kg)	So	McKinney, TX
G	3	Jaylon Johnson	6 ft 0 in (1.83 m)	170 lb (77 kg)	Jr	Houston, TX
G	4	Ray Glasgow	6 ft 3 in (1.91 m)	180 lb (82 kg)	Jr	The Bronx, NY
F	5	Rodney Jr. Johnson	6 ft 5 in (1.96 m)	220 lb (100 kg)	Sr	Bryan, TX
F	7	JuJuan Nicholls	6 ft 8 in (2.03 m)	220 lb (100 kg)	So	Scranton, PA
F	8	Ola Ajiboye	6 ft 8 in (2.03 m)	210 lb (95 kg)	Jr	Chicago, IL
G	10	Grant Slatten	6 ft 5 in (1.96 m)	195 lb (88 kg)	RS Jr	Sparta, TN
G	11	Grant Strong	6 ft 6 in (1.98 m)	185 lb (84 kg)	RS So	Celina, TN
G	12	Matthew Sells	6 ft 3 in (1.91 m)	180 lb (82 kg)	Sr	Rickman, TN
F	15	Rylee Samons	6 ft 7 in (2.01 m)	195 lb (88 kg)	So	Pikeville, KY
G	30	Colin Ayers	6 ft 0 in (1.83 m)	170 lb (77 kg)	Fr	Hilham, TN
G	33	Bogdan Zimonjic	6 ft 5 in (1.96 m)	190 lb (86 kg)	Sr	Belgrade, Serbia
C	34	David Craig	7 ft 2 in (2.18 m)	235 lb (107 kg)	Jr	Johannesburg, South Africa
G	40	Josh Heard	6 ft 5 in (1.96 m)	180 lb (82 kg)	Fr	Cookeville, TN

Head coach

- John Pelphrey (Kentucky)

Assistant coach(es)

- Alex Fain (Alabama)
- Blake Gray (Alabama)
- Andrew Steele (Alabama)
- Stefan King (Troy)
- Miloš Babić (Tennessee Tech)

Legend

- (C) Team captain
- (S) Suspended
- (I) Ineligible
- (W) Walk-on
- Injured
- Current redshirt

Roster
Last update: November 1, 2024

== Schedule and results ==
Date time, TV	Rank^{#}	Opponent^{#}	Result	Record	Site (attendance) city, state
Exhibition
October 22, 2024*; 6:00 p.m.		Austin Peay; Charity Exhibition	L 80–90	–	Eblen Center; Cookeville, TN
October 29, 2024*; 7:30 p.m.		Oakland City	W 100–56	–	Eblen Center; Cookeville, TN
Regular season
November 4, 2024*; 6:30 p.m., SECN+/ESPN+		at Georgia	L 78–83	0–1	Stegeman Coliseum (6,193); Athens, GA
November 7, 2024*; 6:00 p.m., ESPN+		Bryan	W 89–74	1–1	Eblen Center (639); Cookeville, TN
November 12, 2024*; 6:00 p.m., ESPN+		West Georgia	W 76–73	2–1	Eblen Center (716); Cookeville, TN
November 15, 2024*; 2:30 p.m.		vs. VMI; Greenbrier Tip-Off River Division semifinals	W 72–71	3–1	Colonial Hall (508); White Sulphur Springs, WV
November 16, 2024*; 2:30 p.m.		vs. UT Rio Grande Valley; Greenbrier Tip-Off River Division championship	L 58–83	3–2	Colonial Hall (218); White Sulphur Springs, WV
November 19, 2024*; 6:00 p.m., ESPN+		at UCF; Greenbrier Tip-Off campus game	L 69–80	3–3	Addition Financial Arena (7,522); Orlando, FL
November 27, 2024*; 1:00 p.m., ESPN+		Presbyterian	W 90–75	4–3	Eblen Center (642); Cookeville, TN
November 29, 2024*; 2:00 p.m., SECN+/ESPN+		at Vanderbilt	L 56–87	4–4	Memorial Gymnasium (6,068); Nashville, TN
December 4, 2024*; 6:00 p.m., ESPN+		at North Alabama	L 59–82	4–5	CB&S Bank Arena (1,537); Florence, AL
December 7, 2024*; 1:00 p.m., ESPN+		at West Georgia	L 73–78	4–6	The Coliseum (872); Carrollton, GA
December 17, 2024; 7:30 p.m., ESPN+		at Western Illinois	L 68–71	4–7 (0–1)	Western Hall (746); Macomb, IL
December 19, 2024; 7:30 p.m., ESPN+		at Lindenwood	W 79–73	5–7 (1–1)	Hyland Performance Arena (676); St. Charles, MO
December 29, 2024*; 1:00 p.m., ESPN+		Milligan	W 95–75	6–7	Eblen Center (702); Cookeville, TN
January 2, 2025; 7:30 p.m., ESPN+		Southern Indiana	W 68–64	7–7 (2–1)	Eblen Center (1,296); Cookeville, TN
January 4, 2025; 3:00 p.m., ESPN+		Morehead State	W 74–55	8–7 (3–1)	Eblen Center (1,263); Cookeville, TN
January 9, 2025; 7:30 p.m., ESPN+		at Eastern Illinois	W 69–64	9–7 (4–1)	Lantz Arena (911); Charleston, IL
January 11, 2025; 3:30 p.m., ESPN+		at SIU Edwardsville	L 59–67	9–8 (4–2)	First Community Arena (1,505); Edwardsville, IL
January 16, 2025; 7:30 p.m., ESPN+		Southeast Missouri State	L 70–77	9–9 (4–3)	Eblen Center (1,445); Cookeville, TN
January 18, 2025; 7:30 p.m., ESPN+		Little Rock	L 71–77	9–10 (4–4)	Eblen Center (1,151); Cookeville, TN
January 23, 2025; 7:30 p.m., ESPN+		at Tennessee State	L 77–89	9–11 (4–5)	Gentry Complex (1,522); Nashville, TN
January 25, 2025; 3:30 p.m., ESPN+		at UT Martin	W 89–85 ^{OT}	10–11 (5–5)	Skyhawk Arena (1,703); Martin, TN
January 30, 2025; 6:30 p.m., ESPN+		at Morehead State	W 72–64	11–11 (6–5)	Ellis Johnson Arena (1,457); Morehead, KY
February 1, 2025; 3:30 p.m., ESPN+		at Southern Indiana	W 78–65	12–11 (7–5)	Screaming Eagles Arena (1,676); Evansville, IN
February 6, 2025; 7:30 p.m., ESPN+		SIU Edwardsville	L 58–75	12–12 (7–6)	Eblen Center (879); Cookeville, TN
February 8, 2025; 3:00 p.m., ESPN+		Eastern Illinois	W 59–54	13–12 (8–6)	Eblen Center (1,269); Cookeville, TN
February 13, 2025; 7:00 p.m., ESPN+		at Little Rock	L 75–79	13–13 (8–7)	Jack Stephens Center (1,237); Little Rock, AR
February 15, 2025; 3:45 p.m., ESPN+		at Southeast Missouri State	L 69–83	13–14 (8–8)	Show Me Center (2,692); Cape Girardeau, MO
February 20, 2025; 7:30 p.m., ESPN+		UT Martin	W 71–66 ^{OT}	14–14 (9–8)	Eblen Center (1,143); Cookeville, TN
February 22, 2025; 1:00 p.m., ESPNU		Tennessee State	W 77–74	15–14 (10–8)	Eblen Center (1,534); Cookeville, TN
February 27, 2025; 7:30 p.m., ESPN+		Western Illinois	L 69–82	15–15 (10–9)	Eblen Center; Cookeville, TN
March 1, 2025; 3:00 p.m., ESPN+		Lindenwood	L 74–76	15–16 (10–10)	Eblen Center (1,789); Cookeville, TN
OVC tournament
March 5, 2025; 6:00 p.m., ESPN+	(5)	vs. (8) UT Martin; First round	L 67–70	15–17	Ford Center; Evansville, IN
*Non-conference game. ^{#}Rankings from AP poll. (#) Tournament seedings in parentheses. All times are in Central.
