= Jeremy Shulman =

American basketball coach (born 1979)

Current position
- Title: Head coach
- Team: UT Martin
- Conference: OVC
- Record: 39–32 (.549)

Biographical details
- Born: October 1, 1979 (age 47)
- Education: Middle Tennessee State

Coaching career (HC unless noted)
- 2007–2010: East Mississippi CC (assistant)
- 2010–2024: Eastern Florida State College
- 2024–present: UT Martin

Head coaching record
- Overall: 39–32 (.549) (NCAA); 346–107 (.764) (NJCAA)

Jeremy Lawrence Shulman (born October 1, 1979) is an American basketball coach. He is currently the head coach of the UT Martin Skyhawks men's basketball team.

== Career ==
Shulman began his career coaching at AAU before serving as an assistant at East Mississippi Community College. In 2010, Shulman was hired as the head coach at Eastern Florida State College, where he would coach for 14 years, finishing with a combined record of 346–107 and leading the Titans to five appearances in the NJCAA tournament. In 2023, he was inducted into the FCSAA Men's Basketball Hall of Fame.

On March 27, 2024, Shulman was named the next head coach at UT Martin, replacing Ryan Ridder.

== Head coaching record ==
=== NCAA DI ===
Record table
Season	Team	Overall	Conference	Standing	Postseason
UT Martin (Ohio Valley) (2024–present)
2024–25	UT Martin	14–19	9–11	8th	
2025–26	UT Martin	22–11	13–7	4th	
2026–27	UT Martin	3–2	0–0		
UT Martin:		39–32 (.549)	22–18 (.550)		
Total:		39–32 (.549)			
National champion Postseason invitational champion Conference regular season champion Conference regular season and conference tournament champion Division regular season champion Division regular season and conference tournament champion Conference tournament champion

== Personal life ==
Shulman's uncle, John Shulman, is the head men's basketball coach at Central Arkansas.
