= 2024–25 Western Illinois Leathernecks men's basketball team =

American college basketball season

2024–25 Western Illinois Leathernecks men's basketball
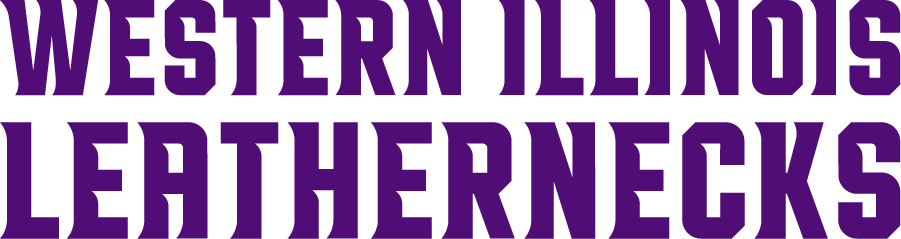
- Conference: Ohio Valley Conference
- Record: 12–19 (6–14 OVC)
- Head coach: Chad Boudreau (2nd season)
- Associate head coach: Kyle Heikkinen
- Assistant coaches: Chris Hill; John Clancy; Kamrein Street; Kris Glover
- Home arena: Western Hall

2024–25 Ohio Valley Conference men's basketball standings
	Conf.				Overall
Team	W		L	PCT	W		L	PCT
Southeast Missouri State	15	–	5	.750	21	–	12	.636
SIU Edwardsville †	13	–	7	.650	22	–	12	.647
Tennessee State	12	–	8	.600	17	–	16	.515
Little Rock	12	–	8	.600	19	–	14	.576
Tennessee Tech	10	–	10	.500	15	–	17	.469
Lindenwood*	10	–	10	.500	16	–	17	.485
Morehead State	10	–	10	.500	15	–	17	.469
UT Martin	9	–	11	.450	14	–	19	.424
Eastern Illinois	8	–	12	.400	12	–	19	.387
Western Illinois	6	–	14	.300	12	–	19	.387
Southern Indiana*	5	–	15	.250	10	–	20	.333
† 2025 OVC tournament winner * ineligible for the 2025 NCAA tournament due to transition period

The 2024–25 Western Illinois Leathernecks men's basketball team represented Western Illinois University during the 2024–25 NCAA Division I men's basketball season. The Leathernecks, led by second-year head coach Chad Boudreau, played their home games at Western Hall in Macomb, Illinois, as second-year members of the Ohio Valley Conference.

== Previous season ==
The Leathernecks finished the 2023–24 season 21–12, 13–5 in OVC play to finish in fourth place. They defeated Tennessee State, before falling to Little Rock in the semifinals of the OVC tournament.

== Roster ==
2024–25 Western Illinois Leathernecks men's basketball team
Players
Coaches

Pos.	#	Name	Height	Weight	Year	Previous school	Hometown
G	0	Julius Rollins	6 ft 7 in (2.01 m)	199 lb (90 kg)	RS Jr	Kent State	Chicago, Illinois
F	1	Kayden Carter	6 ft 7 in (2.01 m)	205 lb (93 kg)	Jr	Northeastern Oklahoma	Norman, Oklahoma
G	2	Ryan Myers	6 ft 1 in (1.85 m)	180 lb (82 kg)	Sr	Indian Hills CC	Brooklyn, New York
G	3	Marko Maletic	6 ft 6 in (1.98 m)	208 lb (94 kg)	Sr	Toledo	London, Ontario
G	4	Kimahri Wilson	6 ft 1 in (1.85 m)	170 lb (77 kg)	RS Jr	Stephen F. Austin	North Chicago, Illinois
F	5	Trey Deveaux	6 ft 5 in (1.96 m)	205 lb (93 kg)	Sr	Wayne State	Lincoln, Nebraska
G/F	10	Caleb Thompson	6 ft 5 in (1.96 m)	187 lb (85 kg)	So	Messiah	St. Charles, Missouri
F	11	Ifiok Peter	6 ft 6 in (1.98 m)	225 lb (102 kg)	So	Cal State Monterey Bay	Las Vegas, Nevada
F	14	Massal Diouf	6 ft 9 in (2.06 m)	240 lb (109 kg)	Jr	UTSA	Gouda, Netherlands
F	20	Rodrick Payne	6 ft 8 in (2.03 m)	230 lb (104 kg)	RS Jr	Wisconsin–River Falls	Cottage Grove, Minnesota
G/F	23	AJ Dixon	6 ft 5 in (1.96 m)	205 lb (93 kg)	Jr	Triton College	Merrillville, Indiana
F	24	Tay Knox	6 ft 9 in (2.06 m)	210 lb (95 kg)	Jr	Chipola College	Troy, Alabama
F/C	52	Kiyron Powell	6 ft 10 in (2.08 m)	210 lb (95 kg)	Jr	Southern Indiana	Evansville, Indiana
G	55	Sean Smith	6 ft 3 in (1.91 m)	185 lb (84 kg)	Sr	Alabama State	Louisville, Kentucky

Head coach

- Chad Boudreau (Hannibal–LaGrange)

Assistant coach(es)

- Kyle Heikkinen (UW–Whitewater)
- Chris Hill (Milwaukee)
- John Clancy (Concordia–Chicago)
- Kamrein Street (Western Illinois)
- Kris Glover (Missouri)

Legend

- (C) Team captain
- (S) Suspended
- (I) Ineligible
- (W) Walk-on
- Injured
- Current redshirt

Roster
Last update: November 26, 2024

== Schedule and results ==
Date time, TV	Rank^{#}	Opponent^{#}	Result	Record	Site (attendance) city, state
Non-conference regular season
November 4, 2024*; 9:00 pm, MW Network		at San Jose State	W 59–55	1–0	Provident Credit Union Event Center (1,876); San Jose, CA
November 6, 2024*; 8:00 pm, ESPN+		at Pepperdine	L 64–77	1–1	Firestone Fieldhouse (801); Malibu, CA
November 13, 2024*; 7:00 pm, ESPN+		Green Bay	L 73–87	1–2	Western Hall (835); Macomb, IL
November 16, 2024*; 1:00 pm, ESPN+		Central Arkansas	W 63–61	2–2	Western Hall (753); Macomb, IL
November 19, 2024*; 7:00 pm, ESPN+		at Northern Iowa	L 56–82	2–3	McLeod Center (3,659); Cedar Falls, IA
November 21, 2024*; 7:00 pm, ESPN+		Monmouth College	W 73–46	3–3	Western Hall (604); Macomb, IL
November 26, 2024*; 7:00 pm, ESPN+		at South Alabama; Jaguar Classic	W 64–63	4–3	Mitchell Center (1,669); Mobile, AL
November 27, 2024*; 6:00 pm		vs. Incarnate Word; Jaguar Classic	L 75–86	4–4	Mitchell Center (53); Mobile, AL
December 4, 2024; 7:00 pm, ESPN+		at St. Ambrose	W 97–64	5–4	Western Hall (693); Macomb, IL
December 6, 2024*; 7:00 pm, ESPN+		East–West	W 96–49	6–4	Western Hall (529); Macomb, IL
December 14, 2024*; 2:00 pm, SL Network		at South Dakota	L 66–89	6–5	Sanford Coyote Sports Center (1,550); Vermillion, SD
OVC regular season
December 17, 2024; 7:30 pm, ESPN+		Tennessee Tech	W 71–68	7–5 (1–0)	Western Hall (746); Macomb, IL
December 21, 2024; 7:30 pm, ESPN+		at Lindenwood	L 65–71	7–6 (1–1)	Robert F. Hyland Arena (1,001); St. Charles, MO
January 2, 2025; 7:30 pm, ESPN+		at SIU Edwardsville	L 66–77	7–7 (1–2)	First Community Arena (1,989); Edwardsville, IL
January 4, 2025; 3:30 pm, ESPN+		at Eastern Illinois	W 75–67	8–7 (2–2)	Groniger Arena (1,025); Charleston, IL
January 9, 2025; 7:30 pm, ESPN+		UT Martin	L 83–85 ^{OT}	8–8 (2–3)	Western Hall (628); Macomb, IL
January 11, 2025; 3:30 pm, ESPN+		Tennessee State	L 52–72	8–9 (2–4)	Western Hall (589); Macomb, IL
January 16, 2025; 6:30 pm, ESPN+		at Morehead State	L 47–51	8–10 (2–5)	Ellis Johnson Arena (2,107); Morehead, KY
January 18, 2025; 3:30 pm, ESPN+		at Southern Indiana	L 66–78	8–11 (2–6)	Liberty Arena (2,369); Evansville, IN
January 23, 2025; 7:30 pm, ESPN+		Little Rock	L 51–62	8–12 (2–7)	Western Hall (743); Macomb, IL
January 25, 2025; 3:30 pm, ESPN+		Southeast Missouri State	L 51–72	8–13 (2–8)	Western Hall (696); Macomb, IL
January 30, 2025; 7:30 pm, ESPN+		Eastern Illinois	L 59–71	8–14 (2–9)	Western Hall (579); Macomb, IL
February 1, 2025; 3:30 pm, ESPN+		SIU Edwardsville	L 65–69	8–15 (2–10)	Western Hall (1,083); Macomb, IL
February 6, 2025; 7:00 pm, ESPN+		at Tennessee State	L 69–87	8–16 (2–11)	Gentry Center (1,870); Nashville, TN
February 8, 2025; 3:30 pm, ESPN+		at UT Martin	L 70–81	8–17 (2–12)	Skyhawk Arena (1,576); Martin, TN
February 13, 2025; 7:30 pm, ESPN+		Southern Indiana	W 87–62	9–17 (3–12)	Western Hall (512); Macomb, IL
February 15, 2025; 3:30 pm, ESPN+		Morehead State	W 72–67	10–17 (4–12)	Western Hall (489); Macomb, IL
February 20, 2025; 7:30 pm, ESPN+		at Southeast Missouri State	L 66–87	10–18 (4–13)	Show Me Center (2,237); Cape Girardeau, MO
February 22, 2025; 3:00 pm, ESPN+		at Little Rock	L 61–75	10–19 (4–14)	Jack Stephens Center (2,047); Little Rock, AR
February 25, 2025; 7:30 pm, ESPN+		Lindenwood	W 86–81 ^{OT}	11–19 (5–14)	Western Hall (729); Macomb, IL
February 27, 2025; 7:30 pm, ESPN+		at Tennessee Tech	W 82–69	12–19 (6–14)	Hooper Eblen Center; Cookeville, TN
*Non-conference game. ^{#}Rankings from AP Poll. (#) Tournament seedings in parentheses. All times are in Central.
