= 2024–25 Morehead State Eagles men's basketball team =

American college basketball season

2024–25 Morehead State Eagles men's basketball
- Conference: Ohio Valley Conference
- Record: 15–17 (10–10 OVC)
- Head coach: Jonathan Mattox (1st season)
- Associate head coach: Jayson Taylor
- Assistant coaches: Jordon Brooks; Ky Klingsick
- Home arena: Ellis Johnson Arena

2024–25 Ohio Valley Conference men's basketball standings
	Conf.				Overall
Team	W		L	PCT	W		L	PCT
Southeast Missouri State	15	–	5	.750	21	–	12	.636
SIU Edwardsville †	13	–	7	.650	22	–	12	.647
Tennessee State	12	–	8	.600	17	–	16	.515
Little Rock	12	–	8	.600	19	–	14	.576
Tennessee Tech	10	–	10	.500	15	–	17	.469
Lindenwood*	10	–	10	.500	16	–	17	.485
Morehead State	10	–	10	.500	15	–	17	.469
UT Martin	9	–	11	.450	14	–	19	.424
Eastern Illinois	8	–	12	.400	12	–	19	.387
Western Illinois	6	–	14	.300	12	–	19	.387
Southern Indiana*	5	–	15	.250	10	–	20	.333
† 2025 OVC tournament winner * ineligible for the 2025 NCAA tournament due to transition period

The 2024–25 Morehead State Eagles men's basketball team represented Morehead State University in the 2024–25 NCAA Division I men's basketball season. The Eagles, led by first-year head coach Jonathan Mattox, played their home games at Ellis Johnson Arena in Morehead, Kentucky as members of the Ohio Valley Conference (OVC).

== Previous season ==
The Eagles finished the 2023–24 season 26–9, 14–4 in OVC play, to finish in a three-way tie for first place. In the OVC tournament, they defeated SIU Edwardsville in the quarterfinals, UT Martin in the semifinals, advancing to the championship game, where they defeated top-seeded Little Rock, earning the Eagles their first trip to the NCAA tournament since 2021. In the NCAA tournament, they received the #14 seed in the East Region, where they lost to #3 seeded Illinois in the first round.

On March 29, 2024, Eagles head coach Preston Spradlin left the school to become the head coach at James Madison. In April, the school named Jonathan Mattox the team's next head coach.

== Roster ==
2024–25 Morehead State Eagles men's basketball team
Players
Coaches

Pos.	#	Name	Height	Weight	Year	Hometown
G	0	Jalen Breazeale	5 ft 11 in (1.8 m)	160 lb (73 kg)	RS Jr	Greenville, SC
G	1	Jerone Morton	6 ft 4 in (1.93 m)	200 lb (91 kg)	So	Winchester, KY
G	2	Steven Clay	6 ft 4 in (1.93 m)	185 lb (84 kg)	Jr	Milwaukee, WI
G	3	Kade Ruegsegger	6 ft 4 in (1.93 m)	190 lb (86 kg)	GS	Dover, OH
G	4	Christian Doerr	6 ft 3 in (1.91 m)	180 lb (82 kg)	Fr	Louisville, KY
G	5	Tyler Brelsford	6 ft 4 in (1.93 m)	185 lb (84 kg)	GS	Ellicott, MD
F	8	Anouar Mellouk	6 ft 8 in (2.03 m)	205 lb (93 kg)	RS Jr	Amsterdam, Netherlands
G	10	Brady Dingess	6 ft 1 in (1.85 m)	200 lb (91 kg)	RS So	Inez, KY
G	11	Trent Scott	6 ft 4 in (1.93 m)	190 lb (86 kg)	RS So	Tampa, FL
G	12	George Marshall	6 ft 4 in (1.93 m)	185 lb (84 kg)	Jr	Jackson, MS
F	13	Kenny Jr. White	6 ft 7 in (2.01 m)	225 lb (102 kg)	Sr	Madisonville, KY
F	14	Jaden Webb	6 ft 10 in (2.08 m)	205 lb (93 kg)	RS So	Memphis, TN
F	15	Khouri Carvey	6 ft 9 in (2.06 m)	250 lb (113 kg)	Jr	Wilson, NC
G	22	Jace Winkleman	6 ft 3 in (1.91 m)	165 lb (75 kg)	Fr	Morehead, KY
F	23	Dieonte Miles	7 ft 0 in (2.13 m)	240 lb (109 kg)	GS	Walton, KY
G	24	Jalen Windham	6 ft 5 in (1.96 m)	205 lb (93 kg)	GS	Indianapolis, IN

Head coach

- Jonathan Mattox (Emmanuel)

Assistant coach(es)

- Jayson Taylor (Jacksonville State)
- Jordan Brooks (Hampton)
- Ky Klingsick (Oklahoma State)

Legend

- (C) Team captain
- (S) Suspended
- (I) Ineligible
- (W) Walk-on
- Injured
- Current redshirt

Roster
Last update: October 29, 2024

== Schedule and results ==
Date time, TV	Rank^{#}	Opponent^{#}	Result	Record	Site (attendance) city, state
Regular season
November 4, 2024*; 7:00 p.m., ACCNX/ESPN+		at Louisville	L 45–93	0–1	KFC Yum! Center (12,490); Louisville, KY
November 6, 2024*; 7:00 p.m., ESPN+		Boyce	W 89–48	1–1	Ellis Johnson Arena (1,115); Morehead, KY
November 8, 2024*; 7:00 p.m., ESPN+		at No. 20 Cincinnati	L 56–83	1–2	Fifth Third Arena (10,604); Cincinnati, OH
November 14, 2024*; 8:00 p.m., ESPN+		at Chattanooga	L 62–76	1–3	McKenzie Arena (2,867); Chattanooga, TN
November 20, 2024*; 7:00 p.m., ESPN+		Austin Peay	W 63–58	2–3	Ellis Johnson Arena (1,912); Morehead, KY
November 27, 2024*; 4:00 p.m., ESPN+		vs. NJIT; Cleveland State Tournament	L 69–78	2–4	Woodling Gym (107); Cleveland, OH
November 29, 2024*; 7:00 p.m., ESPN+		at Cleveland State; Cleveland State Tournament	W 71–69	3–4	Woodling Gym (517); Cleveland, OH
December 4, 2024*; 7:00 p.m., ESPN+		at Marshall	L 77–80	3–5	Cam Henderson Center (3,836); Huntington, WV
December 7, 2024*; 2:00 p.m., ESPN+		at Ohio	L 76–88	3–6	Convocation Center (3,128); Athens, OH
December 15, 2024*; 12:30 p.m., ESPN+		Kentucky Christian	W 86–63	4–6	Ellis Johnson Arena (1,034); Morehead, KY
December 19, 2024; 7:30 p.m., ESPN+		UT Martin	W 70–69 ^{OT}	5–6 (1–0)	Ellis Johnson Arena (1,081); Morehead, KY
December 21, 2024; 3:30 p.m., ESPN+		Tennessee State	W 74–68	6–6 (2–0)	Ellis Johnson Arena (1,076); Morehead, KY
December 28, 2024*; 12:00 p.m., ESPN+		Alice Lloyd	W 94–63	7–6	Ellis Johnson Arena (1,033); Morehead, KY
December 31, 2024; 8:30 p.m., ESPN+		at Southern Indiana	W 70–68	8–6 (3–0)	Screaming Eagles Arena (2,091); Evansville, IN
January 4, 2025; 5:00 p.m., ESPN+		at Tennessee Tech	L 55–74	8–7 (3–1)	Eblen Center (1,263); Cookeville, TN
January 9, 2025; 8:00 p.m., ESPN+		at Little Rock	W 59–53	9–7 (4–1)	Jack Stephens Center (493); Little Rock, AR
January 11, 2025; 4:45 p.m., ESPN+		at Southeast Missouri State	W 67–56	10–7 (5–1)	Show Me Center (1,216); Cape Girardeau, MO
January 16, 2025; 7:30 p.m., ESPN+		Western Illinois	W 51–47	11–7 (6–1)	Ellis Johnson Arena (2,107); Morehead, KY
January 18, 2025; 3:30 p.m., ESPN+		Lindenwood	W 82–65	12–7 (7–1)	Ellis Johnson Arena (1,554); Morehead, KY
January 23, 2025; 4:30 p.m., ESPN+		at Eastern Illinois	W 73–66	13–7 (8–1)	Lantz Arena (1,626); Charleston, IL
January 25, 2025; 4:30 p.m., ESPN+		at SIU Edwardsville	L 54–65	13–8 (8–2)	First Community Arena (1,818); Edwardsville, IL
January 28, 2025; 8:30 p.m., ESPN+		Southern Indiana	W 66–65	14–8 (9–2)	Ellis Johnson Arena (1,236); Morehead, KY
January 30, 2025; 7:30 p.m., ESPN+		at Tennessee Tech	L 64–72	14–9 (9–3)	Ellis Johnson Arena (1,457); Morehead, KY
February 6, 2025; 7:30 p.m., ESPN+		Southeast Missouri State	L 51–80	14–10 (9–4)	Ellis Johnson Arena (2,345); Morehead, KY
February 8, 2025; 3:30 p.m., ESPN+		Little Rock	L 62–76	14–11 (9–5)	Ellis Johnson Arena (1,956); Morehead, KY
February 13, 2025; 8:30 p.m., ESPN+		at Lindenwood	L 60–73	14–12 (9–6)	Hyland Performance Arena (1,131); St. Charles, MO
February 15, 2025; 4:30 p.m., ESPN+		at Western Illinois	L 67–72	14–13 (9–7)	Western Hall (489); Macomb, IL
February 20, 2025; 7:30 p.m., ESPN+		SIU Edwardsville	L 62–80	14–14 (9–8)	Ellis Johnson Arena (1,545); Morehead, KY
February 22, 2025; 3:30 p.m., ESPN+		Eastern Illinois	L 62–67	14–15 (9–9)	Ellis Johnson Arena (1,276); Morehead, KY
February 27, 2025; 8:30 p.m., ESPN+		at Tennessee State	L 55–64	14–16 (9–10)	Gentry Complex; Nashville, TN
March 1, 2025; 4:30 p.m., ESPN+		at UT Martin	W 59–47	15–16 (10–10)	Skyhawk Arena (1,487); Martin, TN
OVC tournament
March 5, 2025; 9:30 p.m., ESPN+	(7)	vs. (6) Lindenwood; First round	L 65–73	15–17	Ford Center (797); Evansville, IN
*Non-conference game. ^{#}Rankings from AP poll. (#) Tournament seedings in parentheses. All times are in Eastern.
