= 2025 Ohio Valley Conference men's basketball tournament =

- Classification: Division I
- Season: 2024–25
- Teams: 8
- Site: Ford Center; Evansville, Indiana
- Champions: SIU Edwardsville (1st title)
- Winning coach: Brian Barone (1st title)
- MVP: Ray'Sean Taylor (SIU Edwardsville)
- Attendance: 5,404
- Television: ESPN+, ESPNU, ESPN2

2024–25 Ohio Valley Conference men's basketball standings
	Conf.				Overall
Team	W		L	PCT	W		L	PCT
Southeast Missouri State	15	–	5	.750	21	–	12	.636
SIU Edwardsville †	13	–	7	.650	22	–	12	.647
Tennessee State	12	–	8	.600	17	–	16	.515
Little Rock	12	–	8	.600	19	–	14	.576
Tennessee Tech	10	–	10	.500	15	–	17	.469
Lindenwood*	10	–	10	.500	16	–	17	.485
Morehead State	10	–	10	.500	15	–	17	.469
UT Martin	9	–	11	.450	14	–	19	.424
Eastern Illinois	8	–	12	.400	12	–	19	.387
Western Illinois	6	–	14	.300	12	–	19	.387
Southern Indiana*	5	–	15	.250	10	–	20	.333
† 2025 OVC tournament winner * ineligible for the 2025 NCAA tournament due to transition period

The 2025 Ohio Valley Conference Men's Basketball Tournament was the final event of the 2024–25 NCAA Division I men's basketball season in the Ohio Valley Conference. The tournament was held March 5–8, 2025 at the Ford Center in Evansville, Indiana. The tournament winner, SIU Edwardsville, received the conference's automatic bid to the 2025 NCAA Division I men's basketball tournament.

== Seeds ==
Only the top eight teams in the conference will qualify for the tournament. Teams will be seeded by record within the conference, with a tiebreaker system to seed teams with identical conference records.

Because Southern Indiana and Lindenwood are ineligible for the NCAA Tournament, the conference's automatic bid goes to the tournament runner-up if either wins the Ohio Valley Conference Tournament. If that team is also not eligible, i.e. both ineligible teams met in the tournament final, the automatic bid goes to the higher-seeded tournament-eligible semifinal loser.

Seed	School	Conference	Tiebreaker
1	Southeast Missouri State	15–5	
2	SIU Edwardsville	13–7	
3	Tennessee State	12–8	2–0 vs. Little Rock
4	Little Rock	12–8	0–2 vs. Tennessee State
5	Tennessee Tech	10–10	3–1 vs. Lindenwood/Morehead State
6	Lindenwood	10–10	2–2 vs. Tennessee Tech/Morehead State
7	Morehead State	10–10	1–3 vs. Tennessee Tech/Lindenwood
8	UT Martin	9–11	
DNQ	Eastern Illinois	8–12	
DNQ	Western Illinois	6–14	
DNQ	Southern Indiana	5–15	

== Schedule ==
Game	Time	Matchup	Score	Television
First Round – Wednesday, March 5
1	6:00 pm	No. 5 Tennessee Tech vs. No. 8 UT Martin	67–70	ESPN+
2	8:30 pm	No. 6 Lindenwood vs. No. 7 Morehead State	73–65	ESPN+
Quarterfinals – Thursday, March 6
3	6:00 pm	No. 4 Little Rock vs. No. 8 UT Martin	82–77	ESPN+
4	8:30 pm	No. 3 Tennessee State vs. No. 6 Lindenwood	69–55	ESPN+
Semifinals – Friday, March 7
5	7:00 pm	No. 1 Southeast Missouri State vs. No. 4 Little Rock	78–59	ESPNU
6	9:30 pm	No. 2 SIU Edwardsville vs. No. 3 Tennessee State	71–69	ESPNU
Championship – Saturday, March 8
7	8:00 pm	No. 1 Southeast Missouri State vs. No. 2 SIU Edwardsville	48–69	ESPN2
All game times in CST.

== Bracket ==
First Round; Wednesday, March 5
5	Tennessee Tech	67
8	UT Martin	70
6	Lindenwood	73
7	Morehead State	65

Quarterfinals; Thursday, March 6
4	Little Rock	82
8	UT Martin	77
3	Tennessee State	69
6	Lindenwood	55

Semifinals; Friday, March 7
1	Southeast Missouri State	78
4	Little Rock	59
2	SIU Edwardsville	71
3	Tennessee State	69

Championship; Saturday, March 8
1	Southeast Missouri State	48
2	SIU Edwardsville	69

== All-Tournament Team ==
- Ray’Sean Taylor, SIUE (MVP)
- Ring Malith, SIUE
- Myles Thompson, SIUE
- Rob Martin, Southeast Missouri
- Mwani Wilkinson, Little Rock
