= 2024–25 Eastern Illinois Panthers men's basketball team =

American college basketball season

2024–25 Eastern Illinois Panthers men's basketball
- Conference: Ohio Valley Conference
- Record: 12–19 (8–12 OVC)
- Head coach: Marty Simmons (4th season)
- Assistant coaches: Kylen Butler; Rich McBride; Bob Lockart; Nate Michael
- Home arena: Groniger Arena

2024–25 Ohio Valley Conference men's basketball standings
	Conf.				Overall
Team	W		L	PCT	W		L	PCT
Southeast Missouri State	15	–	5	.750	21	–	12	.636
SIU Edwardsville †	13	–	7	.650	22	–	12	.647
Tennessee State	12	–	8	.600	17	–	16	.515
Little Rock	12	–	8	.600	19	–	14	.576
Tennessee Tech	10	–	10	.500	15	–	17	.469
Lindenwood*	10	–	10	.500	16	–	17	.485
Morehead State	10	–	10	.500	15	–	17	.469
UT Martin	9	–	11	.450	14	–	19	.424
Eastern Illinois	8	–	12	.400	12	–	19	.387
Western Illinois	6	–	14	.300	12	–	19	.387
Southern Indiana*	5	–	15	.250	10	–	20	.333
† 2025 OVC tournament winner * ineligible for the 2025 NCAA tournament due to transition period

The 2024–25 Eastern Illinois Panthers men's basketball team represented Eastern Illinois University during the 2024–25 NCAA Division I men's basketball season. The Panthers, led by fourth-year head coach Marty Simmons, played their home games at Groniger Arena in Charleston, Illinois as members of the Ohio Valley Conference (OVC).

The Panthers finished the season 12–19, 8–12 in OVC play, to finish in ninth place.

== Previous season ==
The Panthers finished the 2023–24 season 14–18, 8–10 in OVC play, to finish in seventh place. They were defeated by SIU Edwardsville in the first round of the OVC tournament.

== Roster ==
2024–25 Eastern Illinois Panthers men's basketball team
Players
Coaches

Pos.	#	Name	Height	Weight	Year	Previous school	Hometown
G	1	Corey Jr. Sawyer	6 ft 4 in (1.93 m)	160 lb (73 kg)	Sr	Cloud County Community College	Orlando, Florida
G	2	Artese Stapleton	6 ft 3 in (1.91 m)	170 lb (77 kg)	GS	Kansas City	Chicago, IL
G	3	Nakyel Shelton	6 ft 3 in (1.91 m)	180 lb (82 kg)	Sr	South Suburban College	Chicago, IL
G	4	Isaiah Griffin	6 ft 0 in (1.83 m)	155 lb (70 kg)	So	Sunrise Christian Academy	Orange, NJ
G	5	Zion Fruster	6 ft 2 in (1.88 m)	170 lb (77 kg)	Jr	UVA Wise	Douglasville, GA
G	6	Kam O'Connor	6 ft 0 in (1.83 m)	170 lb (77 kg)	RS So	UNC Pembroke	Lebanon, OH
F	8	Blake Goodman	6 ft 7 in (2.01 m)	200 lb (91 kg)	RS Jr	Fisk	Detroit, MI
G	9	Obadiah Curtis	6 ft 5 in (1.96 m)	200 lb (91 kg)	RS Jr	Arkansas State	Fresno, CA
F	10	Jackson Connor	6 ft 6 in (1.98 m)	210 lb (95 kg)	RS Jr	John A. Logan College	Marion, IL
G	11	Malik Olafioye	6 ft 2 in (1.88 m)	190 lb (86 kg)	RS Fr	Kansas City	Ecorse, MI
G	12	Carson Prost	6 ft 3 in (1.91 m)	185 lb (84 kg)	Sr	Rend Lake College	Mount Vernon, IL
F	17	Lazar Grbovic	6 ft 8 in (2.03 m)	240 lb (109 kg)	RS Jr	Moberly Area Community College	Belgrade, Serbia
F	22	Sekou Kalle	6 ft 10 in (2.08 m)	220 lb (100 kg)	Sr	Evansville	Sellersburg, IN
F	23	Rodolfo Bolis	6 ft 8 in (2.03 m)	255 lb (116 kg)	Sr	NBA Academy Latin America	Espírito Santo, Brazil
F	24	Terry McMorris	6 ft 7 in (2.01 m)	185 lb (84 kg)	Fr	Link Year Prep	Oklahoma City, OK
F	40	Kooper Jacobi	6 ft 7 in (2.01 m)	200 lb (91 kg)	GS	Toledo	Sellersburg, IN

Head coach

- Marty Simmons (Evansville)

Assistant coach(es)

- Kylen Butler (Indianapolis)
- Rich McBride (Illinois)
- Bob Lockart (Millikin)
- Nate Michael (McKendree)

Legend

- (C) Team captain
- (S) Suspended
- (I) Ineligible
- (W) Walk-on
- Injured
- Current redshirt

Roster
Last update: November 29, 2024

== Schedule and results ==
Date time, TV	Rank^{#}	Opponent^{#}	Result	Record	Site (attendance) city, state
Regular season
November 4, 2024*; 7:00 p.m., B1G+		at Illinois	L 67–112	0–1	State Farm Center (15,246); Champaign, IL
November 6, 2024*; 7:00 p.m., ESPN+		Earlham	W 97–61	1–1	Groniger Arena (1,350); Charleston, IL
November 10, 2024*; 11:00 a.m., B1G+		at No. 17 Indiana	L 55–90	1–2	Simon Skjodt Assembly Hall (17,222); Bloomington, IN
November 15, 2024*; 7:00 p.m., Peacock		at Northwestern	L 58–67 ^{OT}	1–3	Welsh–Ryan Arena (5,969); Evanston, IL
November 19, 2024*; 8:00 p.m., FS2		at DePaul; DePaul Classic	L 69–78	1–4	Wintrust Arena (2,829); Chicago, IL
November 24, 2024*; 1:00 p.m., ESPN+		at Valparaiso; DePaul Classic	L 53–81	1–5	Athletics–Recreation Center (1,354); Valparaiso, IN
November 29, 2024*; 2:00 p.m., ESPN+		Northern Illinois; DePaul Classic	W 72–59	2–5	Groniger Arena (715); Charleston, IL
December 3, 2024*; 5:30 p.m., FS2		at Butler	L 58–73	2–6	Hinkle Fieldhouse (6,886); Indianapolis, IN
December 6, 2024*; 12:00 p.m., ESPN+		Calumet	W 87–57	3–6	Groniger Arena (2,839); Charleston, IL
December 14, 2024*; 7:00 p.m., ESPN+		at Eastern Kentucky	L 66–81	3–7	Seabury Center (457); Berea, KY
December 19, 2024; 7:30 p.m., ESPN+		at Southeast Missouri State	L 72–79	3–8 (0–1)	Show Me Center (840); Cape Girardeau, MO
December 28, 2024*; 2:00 p.m., ESPN+		Blackburn	W 99–55	4–8	Groniger Arena (757); Charleston, IL
January 2, 2025; 7:30 p.m., ESPN+		Lindenwood	W 78–74 ^{OT}	5–8 (1–1)	Groniger Arena (735); Charleston, IL
January 4, 2025; 3:30 p.m., ESPN+		Western Illinois	L 67–75	5–9 (1–2)	Groniger Arena (1,025); Charleston, IL
January 7, 2025; 7:30 p.m., ESPN+		SIU Edwardsville	L 57–60	5–10 (1–3)	Groniger Arena (635); Charleston, IL
January 9, 2025; 7:30 p.m., ESPN+		Tennessee Tech	L 64–69	5–11 (1–4)	Groniger Arena (911); Charleston, IL
January 16, 2025; 7:30 p.m., ESPN+		at UT Martin	L 63–68	5–12 (1–5)	Skyhawk Arena (1,579); Martin, TN
January 18, 2025; 3:30 p.m., ESPN+		at Tennessee State	L 65–84	5–13 (1–6)	Gentry Center; Nashville, TN
January 23, 2025; 7:30 p.m., ESPN+		Morehead State	L 66–73	5–14 (1–7)	Groniger Arena (1,626); Charleston, IL
January 25, 2025; 3:30 p.m., ESPN+		Southern Indiana	L 60–64	5–15 (1–8)	Groniger Arena (1,710); Charleston, IL
January 27, 2025; 2:00 p.m., ESPN+		vs. Little Rock; Rescheduled from Dec. 21	W 56–54	6–15 (2–8)	Robert F. Hyland Arena (52); St. Charles, MO
January 30, 2025; 7:30 p.m., ESPN+		at Western Illinois	W 71–59	7–15 (3–8)	Western Hall (579); Macomb, IL
February 1, 2025; 3:30 p.m., ESPN+		at Lindenwood	W 76–70	8–15 (4–8)	Robert F. Hyland Arena (1,194); St. Charles, MO
February 4, 2025; 7:30 p.m., ESPN+		at SIU Edwardsville	L 41–66	8–16 (4–9)	First Community Arena (1,415); Edwardsville, IL
February 8, 2025; 3:00 p.m., ESPN+		at Tennessee Tech	L 54–59	8–17 (4–10)	Hooper Eblen Center (1,269); Cookeville, TN
February 13, 2025; 7:30 p.m., ESPN+		Tennessee State	L 49–66	8–18 (4–11)	Groniger Arena (1,075); Charleston, IL
February 15, 2025; 3:30 p.m., ESPN+		UT Martin	L 68–72	8–19 (4–12)	Groniger Arena (1,041); Charleston, IL
February 20, 2025; 7:30 p.m., ESPN+		at Southern Indiana	W 63–54	9–19 (5–12)	Liberty Arena (1,344); Evansville, IN
February 22, 2025; 2:30 p.m., ESPN+		at Morehead State	W 67–62	10–19 (6–12)	Ellis Johnson Arena (1,276); Morehead, KY
February 27, 2025; 7:30 p.m., ESPN+		Little Rock	W 71–60	11–19 (7–12)	Groniger Arena (1,367); Charleston, IL
March 1, 2025; 3:30 p.m., ESPN+		Southeast Missouri State	W 73–58	12–19 (8–12)	Groniger Arena (1,632); Charleston, IL
*Non-conference game. ^{#}Rankings from AP poll. (#) Tournament seedings in parentheses. All times are in Central.
