= Evansville Christian School =

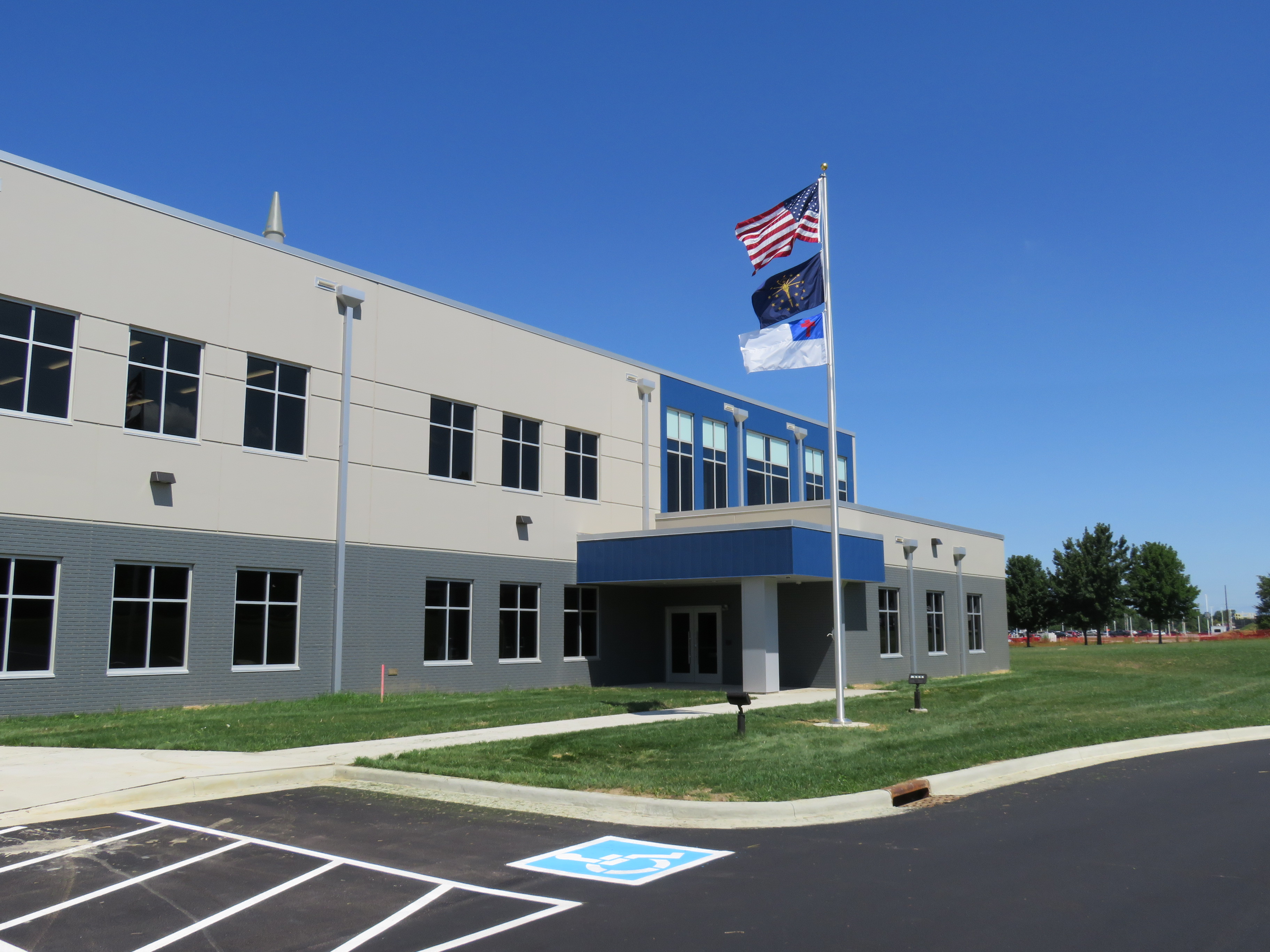
- ECS's Epworth Campus

Location
- 4401 Epworth Rd; Newburgh, Indiana 47630; United States; 37.970074°N 87.496447°W

Information
- School type: Private Christian
- Denomination: Non-denominational
- Established: 1975
- Director: Mike Allen
- Staff: 92
- Teaching staff: 70
- Grades: PS - high school
- Age range: 3-18
- Enrollment: 1,063 (2023-2024)
- Average class size: 18
- Student to teacher ratio: 13
- Colors: Blue and Gold
- Slogan: Growth, Relationships, and Service to the Glory of God
- Mascot: Eagle
- Website: https://evansvillechristianschool.org/

Evansville Christian School (ECS) is a private Christian school corporation with several locations throughout the Evansville, tri-state area in southwestern Indiana, USA.

According to the Indiana Department of Education, ECS is an A-Rated, four-star school. It is fully accredited by the Indiana Department of Education, the Association of Christian Schools International and the North Central Association Commission on Accreditation and School Improvement.

== History ==
Evansville Christian School was founded in 1975 by Bethel Temple Church. The private school corporation started with 143 students from kindergarten to sixth grade and received state accreditation during its second year. In 1990, it was incorporated as a non-profit, tax-exempt corporation with an independent board of directors. In 2002, the school started its second campus serving Evansville's north side. Over the years, ECS has experienced a significant increase in activities, athletics, and enrollment.

In 2017, ECS opened its first freestanding campus on a 16-acre site near the intersection of Epworth Road and Lincoln Avenue. ECS currently operates three campuses and has more than 800 students from pre-school to high school.

== Grounds and location ==
=== Pre-kindergarten ===
Since August 2017, ECS has operated a pre-kindergarten campus at Crossroads Christian Church.

=== Elementary school ===
ECS' original "east campus", serving students from pre-kindergarten to fifth grade, was located on Lincoln Avenue inside Bethel Church. The "north campus", serving students from kindergarten to second grade, was located on Millersburg Road inside Christian Fellowship Church. Both of these campuses are no longer in use. Preceding the 2021/22 school year, a second, free-standing campus was built near the intersection of Epworth Road and Lincoln Avenue to accommodate students from kindergarten to sixth grade.

=== Middle school ===
Preceding the 2015/16 school year, both ECS's elementary and junior high students studied at the original east campus. However, as class sizes began to grow, the school worked up a partnership with First Southern Baptist Church to accommodate a middle school campus. As of the 2021/22 school year, the Cullen campus consists of seventh and eighth grade students.

=== High school ===
Talks of establishing a high school began in the early 2010s. In 2014 and 2015, the school board began raising money for a free-standing high school campus on a 16-acre site near the intersection of Epworth Road and Lincoln Avenue. They began construction in early 2016 and accommodated their first freshman class of high school students at their middle campus on Cullen Avenue. The new Epworth campus opened up to begin the 2017/18 school year. The high school site was a 43,000 square foot building with eight flexible learning spaces, two large science laboratories, large music and art rooms, a full-size gym, and a commons area.

=== Debts ===
As of 2021, the elementary building is missing an additional piece, estimated to be worth ~$1.9 million. It has not been added since. It is believed that the school has incurred some amount of debt from this, and it is unlikely that this debt has been resolved due to a recent expansion of the high school in 2025.

=== Future projects ===
As of 2021, the ECS board was rumored to have begun informal talks about purchasing the former site of Tudela Soccer Complex, a six-acre piece of land near the intersection of Epworth Road and Telephone Road. The athletic complex serves as the current home facility for the ECS soccer program. Purchasing land in this vicinity would bring the possibility of constructing a new high school campus on these grounds and housing junior high students at the current high school campus.

== Curriculum ==
Evansville Christian School is structured in teams across their three facilities to meet the needs of pre-school and pre-kindergarten (full-day), kindergarten (full-day), elementary school (1st to 3rd grade), intermediate school (4th and 5th grade), middle school (6th to 8th grade), and high school students.

The school's curriculum is aligned with Indiana's academic standards integrated with Biblical principles. In addition to traditional courses, ECS's curriculum includes Bible, phonics-based reading, 4-block literacy, accelerated reading, technology, media services/library, music, band, art, physical education, drama, speech/debate, and Spanish.
