= Ray'Sean Taylor =

American basketball player (born 2001)

No. 3 – Newcastle Eagles
- Position: Shooting guard
- League: SLB

Personal information
- Born: September 21, 2001 (age 25)
- Listed height: 6 ft 2 in (1.88 m)
- Listed weight: 180 lb (82 kg)

Career information
- High school: Collinsville (Collinsville, Illinois)
- College: SIU Edwardsville (2021–2025)
- NBA draft: 2025: undrafted
- Playing career: 2025–present

Career history
- 2025–present: Newcastle Eagles

Career highlights
- OVC Player of the Year (2025); 2× First-team All-OVC (2023, 2025); OVC All-Newcomer team (2022); OVC tournament MVP (2025)

Ray'Sean Taylor (born September 21, 2001) is an American basketball player for the Newcastle Eagles of the British Super League Basketball (SLB). He played college basketball for the SIU Edwardsville Cougars.

Taylor came to SIU Edwardsville from Collinsville High School in Collinsville, Illinois in 2020. He missed the 2020–21 season with an ACL injury, then ended the following season prematurely with a similar injury.

In his senior season, Taylor averaged 19.1 points per game and led the Cougars to an OVC tournament championship and a berth in the 2025 NCAA tournament. He scored 20 points in the tournament final and was named MVP. At the conclusion of the season, Taylor was named OVC Player of the Year and repeated as a first-team All-OVC pick. Taylor became the school's all-time leading NCAA Division I scorer after just 100 career games. In his final career games, he set the program's all-time scoring record for all divisions (1,962 career points).

Following his college career, Taylor signed with the Newcastle Eagles of the British Super League Basketball (SLB). His record-setting senior season drew the attention of Eagles coach Marc Steutel.
