= Jonathan Mattox =

American basketball coach (born 1988)

Current position
- Title: Head coach
- Team: Morehead State
- Conference: OVC
- Record: 35–30 (.538)

Biographical details
- Born: January 1, 1988 (age 38)

Playing career
- 2007–2009: Anderson
- 2009–2011: Emmanuel

Coaching career (HC unless noted)
- 2011–2013: Emmanuel (assistant)
- 2013–2015: Morehead State (GA)
- 2016–2017: Morehead State (interim assistant)
- 2017–2021: Morehead State (assistant)
- 2021–2022: Morehead State (AHC)
- 2022–2024: Murray State (assistant)
- 2024–present: Morehead State

Administrative career (AD unless noted)
- 2015–2016: Morehead State (DBO)

Head coaching record
- Overall: 35–30 (.538)

Accomplishments and honors

Championships
- OVC regular season (2026)

Awards
- OVC co-Coach of the Year (2026)

Jonathan Matthew Mattox (born January 1, 1988) is an American basketball coach who is the current head coach of the Morehead State Eagles men's basketball team. He played college basketball for the Anderson Trojans and Emmanuel Lions and has previously coached at Emmanuel and Murray State.

== Early life ==
Mattox attended Oconee County High School in Georgia where he played basketball for four years, being a two-time second-team All-Northeast Georgia selection while helping the team have a regional championship as a senior. He played college basketball for the Anderson Trojans in South Carolina before transferring to the Emmanuel Lions in Georgia, helping the latter win 26 games with a Southern States Athletic Conference (SSAC) title in his last year. Mattox received a bachelor's degree from Emmanuel in 2011 and a master's degree from Concordia University Irvine in 2013.

== Coaching career ==
Mattox coached as an assistant for two seasons at Emmanuel following his graduation, helping them go 49–21 from 2011 to 2013. He then served as a graduate assistant for the Morehead State Eagles from 2013 to 2015, was their director of basketball operations from 2015 to 2016, and was an interim assistant coach in the 2016–17 season, before receiving a promotion to full-time assistant coach in 2017.

After having served from 2017–18 to 2020–21 as an assistant, Mattox was promoted to associate head coach for the 2021–22 season. He helped them win the Ohio Valley Conference (OVC) title in 2021 with a runner-up position in 2022. After one season as associate head coach, Mattox was hired away to be an assistant for the Murray State Racers.

Following two seasons at Murray State, Mattox was named the head coach of Morehead State on April 5, 2024.

== Head coaching record ==
=== NCAA DI ===
Record table
Season	Team	Overall	Conference	Standing	Postseason
Morehead State Eagles (Ohio Valley Conference) (2024–present)
2024–25	Morehead State	15–17	10–10	T–5th	
2025–26	Morehead State	20–13	15–5	T–1st	
Morehead State:		35–30 (.538)	25–15 (.625)		
Total:		35–30 (.538)			
National champion Postseason invitational champion Conference regular season champion Conference regular season and conference tournament champion Division regular season champion Division regular season and conference tournament champion Conference tournament champion
