= UT Martin Skyhawks men's basketball =

Men's college basketball team

2025–26 UT Martin Skyhawks men's basketball team
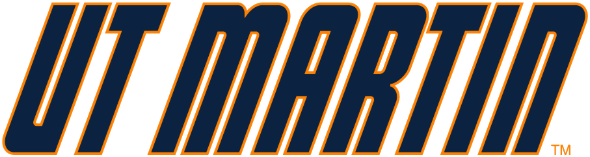
- University: University of Tennessee at Martin
- Head coach: Jeremy Shulman (2nd season)
- Location: Martin, Tennessee
- Arena: Skyhawk Arena (capacity: 4,238)
- Conference: Ohio Valley
- Nickname: Skyhawks
- Colors: Navy blue, orange, and white

NCAA Division I tournament second round
- 1982*

NCAA Division I tournament appearances
- 1982*, 1983*

Conference regular-season champions
- 2009, 2024

Conference division champions
- 2016, 2017
- * at Division II level

The UT Martin Skyhawks men's basketball team is the men's basketball team that represents the University of Tennessee at Martin in Martin, Tennessee, United States. The school's team currently competes in the Ohio Valley Conference. The Skyhawks are coached by Jeremy Shulman. The Skyhawks have never appeared in the NCAA Division I men's basketball tournament.

== Postseason results ==
=== NCAA Division II ===
UT Martin made the NCAA Division II tournament twice. Their record was 1–3.

Year	Round	Opponent	Result
1982	First Round; Sweet Sixteen	Central Missouri State; Southeast Missouri State	W 46–42; L 53–56
1983	First Round; Regional Third Place	Southeast Missouri State; Stephen F. Austin	L 71–83; L 70–83

=== NIT results ===
The Skyhawks have appeared in the National Invitation Tournament (NIT) one time. Their record is 0–1.

Year	Round	Opponent	Result
2009	First Round	Auburn	L 82–87

=== CIT results ===
The Skyhawks have appeared in the CollegeInsider.com Postseason Tournament (CIT) three times. Their record is 5–3.

Year	Round	Opponent	Result
2015	First Round; Second Round; Quarterfinals; Semifinals	Northwestern State; USC Upstate; Eastern Kentucky; Evansville	W 104–79; W 60–49; W 70–69; L 66–79
2016	First Round; Second Round	Central Michigan; Ball State	W 76–73; L 80–83^{OT}
2017	First Round; Second Round	UNC Asheville; Campbell	W 89–75; L 56–73
