= 2023–24 Morehead State Eagles men's basketball team =

American college basketball season

2023–24 Morehead State Eagles men's basketball

Ohio Valley regular-season and tournament champions

NCAA tournament, first round
- Conference: Ohio Valley Conference
- Record: 26–9 (14–4 OVC)
- Head coach: Preston Spradlin (7th season)
- Assistant coaches: Scott Combs; Dominic Lombardi; Cason Burk
- Home arena: Ellis Johnson Arena

2023–24 Ohio Valley Conference men's basketball standings
| | Conf. | | | | Overall |
| Team | W | | L | PCT | W | | L | PCT |
|---|---|---|---|---|---|---|---|---|
| Little Rock | 14 | – | 4 | .778 | 21 | – | 13 | .618 |
| UT Martin | 14 | – | 4 | .778 | 21 | – | 11 | .656 |
| Morehead State † | 14 | – | 4 | .778 | 26 | – | 9 | .743 |
| Western Illinois | 13 | – | 5 | .722 | 21 | – | 12 | .636 |
| Tennessee State | 10 | – | 8 | .556 | 18 | – | 15 | .545 |
| SIU Edwardsville | 9 | – | 9 | .500 | 17 | – | 16 | .515 |
| Eastern Illinois | 8 | – | 10 | .444 | 14 | – | 18 | .438 |
| Southern Indiana* | 5 | – | 13 | .278 | 8 | – | 24 | .250 |
| Tennessee Tech | 5 | – | 13 | .278 | 10 | – | 21 | .323 |
| Southeast Missouri State | 4 | – | 14 | .222 | 9 | – | 22 | .290 |
| Lindenwood* | 3 | – | 15 | .167 | 9 | – | 22 | .290 |
† 2024 OVC tournament winner * ineligible for the 2024 NCAA tournament due to transition period

The 2023–24 Morehead State Eagles men's basketball team represented Morehead State University in the 2023–24 NCAA Division I men's basketball season. The Eagles, led by seventh-year head coach Preston Spradlin, played their home games at Ellis Johnson Arena in Morehead, Kentucky as members of the Ohio Valley Conference (OVC).

== Previous season ==
In the 2022–23 season, with a victory against Eastern Illinois, the Eagles clinched their first outright OVC regular-season title since 1984. They lost to Southeast Missouri State in the OVC tournament semifinals. As a regular-season conference champion who did not win their conference tournament, the Eagles received an automatic bid to the National Invitation Tournament, the school's first trip to the NIT. There they upset No. 1 seed Clemson in the first round before losing to UAB in the second round.

== Roster ==
2023–24 Morehead State Eagles men's basketball team
Players
Coaches

| Pos. | # | Name | Height | Weight | Year | Previous school | Hometown |
|---|---|---|---|---|---|---|---|
| G | 0 | Mark Freeman | 5 ft 11 in (1.8 m) | 170 lb (77 kg) | Sr | Illinois State | Memphis, TN |
| G | 1 | Jerone Morton | 6 ft 4 in (1.93 m) | 200 lb (91 kg) | Fr | George Rogers Clark | Winchester, KY |
| G | 2 | Jordan Lathon | 6 ft 5 in (1.96 m) | 195 lb (88 kg) | GS | Milwaukee | Grandview, MO |
| G | 3 | Drew Thelwell | 6 ft 3 in (1.91 m) | 195 lb (88 kg) | Sr | The Master's Academy | Orlando, FL |
| G | 4 | Eddie III Ricks | 6 ft 7 in (2.01 m) | 205 lb (93 kg) | Fr | Clarksville Academy | Clarksville, TN |
| F | 5 | Zach Iyeyemi | 6 ft 9 in (2.06 m) | 260 lb (118 kg) | GS | Cy-Fair | Houston, TX |
| G | 10 | Brady Dingess | 6 ft 1 in (1.85 m) | 200 lb (91 kg) | RS Fr | Marion County | Inez, KY |
| G | 11 | Trent Scott | 6 ft 4 in (1.93 m) | 190 lb (86 kg) | So | Alonso High School | Tampa, FL |
| G | 12 | George Marshall | 6 ft 3 in (1.91 m) | 185 lb (84 kg) | So | Itawamba | Jackson, MS |
| F | 14 | Jaden Webb | 6 ft 10 in (2.08 m) | 205 lb (93 kg) | RS So | Itawamba | Memphis, TN |
| G | 15 | Kalil Thomas | 6 ft 5 in (1.96 m) | 200 lb (91 kg) | GS | UMass Lowell | New Orleans, LA |
| G | 22 | Riley Minix | 6 ft 7 in (2.01 m) | 230 lb (104 kg) | GS | Southeastern | Vero Beach, FL |
| F | 23 | Dieonte Miles | 7 ft 0 in (2.13 m) | 240 lb (109 kg) | GS | Xavier | Walton, KY |
| G | 24 | Jalen Windham | 6 ft 5 in (1.96 m) | 205 lb (93 kg) | Sr | Ball State | Indianapolis, IN |
| G | 33 | Matt Hain | 6 ft 7 in (2.01 m) | 215 lb (98 kg) | Fr | IMG Academy | Perth, Australia |

Head coach

- Preston Spradlin (Alice Lloyd)

Assistant coach(es)

- Scott Combs (Austin Peay)
- Dominic Lombardi (Indiana (PA))
- Cason Burk (Jackson State)

Legend

- (C) Team captain
- (S) Suspended
- (I) Ineligible
- (W) Walk-on
- Injured
- Current redshirt

Roster
Last update: November 7, 2023

== Schedule and results ==
| Date time, TV | Rank^{#} | Opponent^{#} | Result | Record | Site (attendance) city, state |
Non-conference regular season
| November 6, 2023*; 8:00 p.m., SECN+/ESPN+ | | at No. 24 Alabama | L 73–105 | 0–1 | Coleman Coliseum (9,078); Tuscaloosa, AL |
| November 8, 2023*; 7:00 p.m., ESPN+ | | Shawnee State | W 96–40 | 1–1 | Ellis Johnson Arena (1,667); Morehead, KY |
| November 10, 2023*; 7:00 p.m., BTN+ | | at No. 3 Purdue | L 57–87 | 1–2 | Mackey Arena (14,876); West Lafayette, IN |
| November 14, 2023*; 7:00 p.m., ESPN+ | | Mercer | W 74–66 | 2–2 | Ellis Johnson Arena (1,455); Morehead, KY |
| November 17, 2023*; 7:00 p.m., Peacock | | at Penn State | L 51–74 | 2–3 | Bryce Jordan Center (7,558); University Park, PA |
| November 20, 2023*; 6:30 p.m., ESPN+ | | at Bellarmine | W 64–51 | 3–3 | Freedom Hall (2,018); Louisville, KY |
| November 22, 2023*; 3:30 p.m., ESPN+ | | Midway | W 94–53 | 4–3 | Ellis Johnson Arena (825); Morehead, KY |
| November 29, 2023*; 8:00 p.m., ESPN+ | | at Austin Peay | W 61–50 | 5–3 | F&M Bank Arena (1,003); Clarksville, TN |
| December 3, 2023*; 4:00 p.m., ESPN+ | | Chattanooga | W 87–80 | 6–3 | Ellis Johnson Arena (1,808); Morehead, KY |
| December 10, 2023*; 3:00 p.m., ESPN+ | | at North Alabama | W 86–77 | 7–3 | Flowers Hall (1,269); Florence, AL |
| December 14, 2023*; 7:00 p.m., ESPN+ | | Saint Mary-of-the-Woods | W 102–33 | 8–3 | Ellis Johnson Arena (1,175); Morehead, KY |
| December 19, 2023*; 6:30 p.m., BTN | | at Indiana | L 68–69 | 8–4 | Simon Skjodt Assembly Hall (17,222); Bloomington, IN |
| December 21, 2023*; 12:00 p.m., ESPN+ | | Alice Lloyd | W 101–39 | 9–4 | Ellis Johnson Arena (1,077); Morehead, KY |
Ohio Valley regular season
| December 31, 2023; 4:30 p.m., ESPN+ | | at Southeast Missouri State | W 83–64 | 10–4 (1–0) | Show Me Center (1,849); Cape Girardeau, MO |
| January 4, 2024; 7:00 p.m., ESPN+ | | Tennessee Tech | W 82–57 | 11–4 (2–0) | Ellis Johnson Arena (1,655); Morehead, KY |
| January 6, 2024; 3:00 p.m., ESPN+ | | Tennessee State | W 78–68 | 12–4 (3–0) | Ellis Johnson Arena (1,581); Morehead, KY |
| January 11, 2024; 8:30 p.m., ESPN+ | | at Eastern Illinois | W 78–52 | 13–4 (4–0) | Groniger Arena (1,108); Charleston, IL |
| January 13, 2024; 4:30 p.m., ESPN+ | | at SIU Edwardsville | L 48–61 | 13–5 (4–1) | First Community Arena (1,629); Edwardsville, IL |
| January 18, 2024; 7:00 p.m., ESPN+ | | UT Martin | W 84–66 | 14–5 (5–1) | Ellis Johnson Arena (1,552); Morehead, KY |
| January 20, 2024; 4:30 p.m., ESPN+ | | at Southern Indiana | W 81–70 | 15–5 (6–1) | Screaming Eagles Arena (2,512); Evansville, IN |
| January 27, 2024; 3:00 p.m., ESPN+ | | Western Illinois | W 64–50 | 16–5 (7–1) | Ellis Johnson Arena (2,988); Morehead, KY |
| February 1, 2024; 8:30 p.m., ESPN+ | | at Tennessee State | W 68–49 | 17–5 (8–1) | Gentry Complex (1,178); Nashville, TN |
| February 3, 2024; 4:00 p.m., ESPN+ | | at Tennessee Tech | W 67–60 | 18–5 (9–1) | Eblen Center (1,099); Cookeville, TN |
| February 8, 2024; 7:00 p.m., ESPN+ | | SIU Edwardsville | W 79–68 | 19–5 (10–1) | Ellis Johnson Arena (3,245); Morehead, KY |
| February 10, 2024; 3:00 p.m., ESPN+ | | Eastern Illinois | W 69–57 | 20–5 (11–1) | Ellis Johnson Arena (2,578); Morehead, KY |
| February 15, 2024; 8:00 p.m., ESPN+ | | at Little Rock | L 68–69 | 20–6 (11–2) | Jack Stephens Center (2,102); Little Rock, AR |
| February 17, 2024; 4:30 p.m., ESPN+ | | at UT Martin | L 82–88 | 20–7 (11–3) | Skyhawk Arena (1,485); Martin, TN |
| February 20, 2024; 7:00 p.m., ESPN+ | | Southern Indiana | L 73–80 | 20–8 (11–4) | Ellis Johnson Arena (1,455); Morehead, KY |
| February 22, 2024; 8:30 p.m., ESPN+ | | at Western Illinois | W 78–57 | 21–8 (12–4) | Western Hall (1,006); Macomb, IL |
| February 29, 2024; 7:00 p.m., ESPN+ | | Southeast Missouri State | W 72–50 | 22–8 (13–4) | Ellis Johnson Arena (3,105); Morehead, KY |
| March 2, 2024; 3:00 p.m., ESPN+ | | Lindenwood | W 67–49 | 23–8 (14–4) | Ellis Johnson Arena (2,777); Morehead, KY |
Ohio Valley tournament
| March 7, 2024; 10:00 p.m., ESPN+ | (3) | vs. (6) SIU Edwardsville; Quarterfinals | W 78–63 | 24–8 | Ford Center (1,140); Evansville, IN |
| March 8, 2024; 10:00 p.m., ESPNU | (3) | vs. (2) UT Martin; Semifinals | W 84–78 | 25–8 | Ford Center (1,277); Evansville, IN |
| March 9, 2024; 8:00 p.m., ESPN2 | (3) | vs. (1) Little Rock; Championship | W 69–55 | 26–8 | Ford Center (1,421); Evansville, IN |
NCAA tournament
| March 21, 2024; 2:10 p.m., truTV | (14 E) | vs. (3 E) No. 10 Illinois; First round | L 69–85 | 26–9 | CHI Health Center (17,239); Omaha, NE |
*Non-conference game. ^{#}Rankings from AP poll. (#) Tournament seedings in parentheses. E=East. All times are in Eastern.
