= 2023–24 Southeast Missouri State Redhawks men's basketball team =

American college basketball season

2023–24 Southeast Missouri State Redhawks men's basketball
- Conference: Ohio Valley Conference
- Record: 9–22 (4–14 OVC)
- Head coach: Brad Korn (4th season)
- Assistant coaches: J.R. Reynolds; Connor Wheeler; LaDon Champagnie
- Home arena: Show Me Center

2023–24 Ohio Valley Conference men's basketball standings
| | Conf. | | | | Overall |
| Team | W | | L | PCT | W | | L | PCT |
|---|---|---|---|---|---|---|---|---|
| Little Rock | 14 | – | 4 | .778 | 21 | – | 13 | .618 |
| UT Martin | 14 | – | 4 | .778 | 21 | – | 11 | .656 |
| Morehead State † | 14 | – | 4 | .778 | 26 | – | 9 | .743 |
| Western Illinois | 13 | – | 5 | .722 | 21 | – | 12 | .636 |
| Tennessee State | 10 | – | 8 | .556 | 18 | – | 15 | .545 |
| SIU Edwardsville | 9 | – | 9 | .500 | 17 | – | 16 | .515 |
| Eastern Illinois | 8 | – | 10 | .444 | 14 | – | 18 | .438 |
| Southern Indiana* | 5 | – | 13 | .278 | 8 | – | 24 | .250 |
| Tennessee Tech | 5 | – | 13 | .278 | 10 | – | 21 | .323 |
| Southeast Missouri State | 4 | – | 14 | .222 | 9 | – | 22 | .290 |
| Lindenwood* | 3 | – | 15 | .167 | 9 | – | 22 | .290 |
† 2024 OVC tournament winner * ineligible for the 2024 NCAA tournament due to transition period

The 2023–24 Southeast Missouri State Redhawks men's basketball team represented Southeast Missouri State University during the 2023–24 NCAA Division I men's basketball season. The Redhawks, led by fourth-year head coach Brad Korn, played their home games at the Show Me Center located in Cape Girardeau, Missouri as members of the Ohio Valley Conference. They finished the season 9–22, 4–14 in OVC play to finish in tenth place. They failed to qualify for the OVC Tournament.

== Previous season ==
The Redhawks finished the 2022–23 season 19– 17, 10– 8 in OVC play to finish a three-way tie for third place. As No. 5 seed in the OVC tournament, they defeated Lindenwood, Tennessee State, Morehead State, and Tennessee Tech to win the conference championship. As a result, they received the conference's automatic bid to the NCAA tournament for the second time in school history and first since 2000. As a No. 16 seed in the South region, they lost to Texas A&M–Corpus Christi in the First Four.

== Roster ==
2023–24 Southeast Missouri State Redhawks men's basketball team
Players
Coaches

| Pos. | # | Name | Height | Weight | Year | Previous school | Hometown |
|---|---|---|---|---|---|---|---|
| G | 1 | Rob Martin | 5 ft 10 in (1.78 m) | 160 lb (73 kg) | So | Indiana State | St. Louis, Missouri |
| G | 2 | BJ Ward | 6 ft 0 in (1.83 m) | 180 lb (82 kg) | Fr | Chaminade College Prep | St. Louis, Missouri |
| G | 3 | Aquan Smart | 6 ft 3 in (1.91 m) | 175 lb (79 kg) | Jr | FIU | Evanston, Illinois |
| F | 4 | Adam Larson | 6 ft 9 in (2.06 m) | 180 lb (82 kg) | So | Fennimore HS | Fennimore, Wisconsin |
| G | 5 | TJ Biel | 6 ft 7 in (2.01 m) | 205 lb (93 kg) | Jr | Triton College | Calgary, Alberta |
| C | 10 | David Idada | 7 ft 0 in (2.13 m) | 250 lb (113 kg) | So | Golden State Prep | Barendrecht, Netherlands |
| G | 11 | Evan Eursher | 6 ft 2 in (1.88 m) | 177 lb (80 kg) | So | The Webb School | Hendersonville, Tennessee |
| G | 12 | Asa Barnes | 6 ft 2 in (1.88 m) | 165 lb (75 kg) | Fr | Wichita Southeast HS | Wichita, Kansas |
| F | 21 | Josh Earley | 6 ft 7 in (2.01 m) | 242 lb (110 kg) | Sr | Tulsa | Shawnee Mission, Kansas |
| G | 22 | Gavyn Elkamil | 6 ft 5 in (1.96 m) | 190 lb (86 kg) | So | Tulsa | Pittsburg, Kansas |
| F | 24 | Kobe Clark | 6 ft 6 in (1.98 m) | 180 lb (82 kg) | Jr | Georgetown | St. Louis, Missouri |
| G | 33 | Dylan Branson | 6 ft 5 in (1.96 m) | 220 lb (100 kg) | Jr | Mehlville HS | St. Louis, Missouri |
| C | 35 | Mason Hanback | 7 ft 0 in (2.13 m) | 245 lb (111 kg) | So | Tennessee Prep | Jackson, Tennessee |
| G | 44 | Braxton Stacker | 6 ft 5 in (1.96 m) | 185 lb (84 kg) | So | Murray State | Fairview Heights, Illinois |
| G | 55 | Marqueas Bell | 6 ft 3 in (1.91 m) | 165 lb (75 kg) | Fr | Park Hill HS | Kansas City, Missouri |

Head coach

- Brad Korn (Southern Illinois)

Assistant coach(es)

- J.R. Reynolds (Eastern Illinois)
- Connor Wheeler (SIU Edwardsville)
- LaDon Champagnie (Missouri Baptist)

Legend

- (C) Team captain
- (S) Suspended
- (I) Ineligible
- (W) Walk-on
- Injured
- Current redshirt

Roster
Last update: December 3, 2023

== Schedule and results ==
| Date time, TV | Rank^{#} | Opponent^{#} | Result | Record | Site (attendance) city, state |
Exhibition
| October 23, 2023*; 6:30 pm | | Henderson State | W 76–61 | – | Show Me Center; Cape Girardeau, MO |
Non-conference regular season
| November 6, 2023*; 8:00 pm, ESPN+ | | at Grand Canyon | L 67–88 | 0–1 | GCU Arena (7,186); Phoenix, AZ |
| November 10, 2023*; 7:30 pm, FS2 | | at Butler | L 56–91 | 0–2 | Hinkle Fieldhouse (7,072); Indianapolis, IN |
| November 15, 2023*; 6:30 pm, ESPN+ | | Evansville | L 57–76 | 0–3 | Show Me Center (1,023); Cape Girardeau, MO |
| November 20, 2023*; 6:30 pm, ESPN+ | | Central Arkansas | W 70–68 | 1–3 | Show Me Center (1,231); Cape Girardeau, MO |
| November 25, 2023*; 1:00 pm | | vs. Evansville; Coke Zero Sugar Classic | L 74–93 | 1–4 | McKenzie Arena (2,163); Chattanooga, TN |
| November 26, 2023*; 1:00 pm, ESPN+ | | at Chattanooga; Coke Zero Sugar Classic | L 56–72 | 1–5 | McKenzie Arena (2,907); Chattanooga, TN |
| November 30, 2023*; 7:00 pm, SLN | | at Kansas City | L 44–74 | 1–6 | Swinney Recreation Center (1,297); Kansas City, MO |
| December 3, 2023*; 3:00 pm, ESPN+ | | Missouri Baptist | W 84–56 | 2–6 | Show Me Center (1,242); Cape Girardeau, MO |
| December 6, 2023*; 6:30 pm, ESPN+ | | Harris–Stowe | W 95–45 | 3–6 | Show Me Center (1,563); Cape Girardeau, MO |
| December 9, 2023*; 6:00 pm, ESPN+ | | at Purdue Fort Wayne | L 80–89 | 3–7 | Allen County War Memorial Coliseum (1,838); Fort Wayne, IN |
| December 17, 2023*; 3:00 pm, ESPN+ | | Lindsey Wilson | W 87–59 | 4–7 | Show Me Center (1,869); Cape Girardeau, MO |
| December 21, 2023*; 7:00 pm, ESPN+ | | at Illinois State | L 64–85 | 4–8 | CEFCU Arena (3,361); Normal, IL |
OVC regular season
| December 29, 2023; 7:30 pm, ESPN+ | | Southern Indiana | W 93–91 ^{OT} | 5–8 (1–0) | Show Me Center (1,470); Cape Girardeau, MO |
| December 31, 2023; 3:15 pm, ESPN+ | | Morehead State | L 64–83 | 5–9 (1–1) | Show Me Center (1,849); Cape Girardeau, MO |
| January 4, 2024; 7:30 pm, ESPN+ | | at Western Illinois | L 61–68 | 5–10 (1–2) | Western Hall (629); Macomb, IL |
| January 6, 2024*; 3:00 pm, ESPN+ | | Bethel (TN) | W 71–61 | 6–10 | Show Me Center (1,423); Cape Girardeau, MO |
| January 11, 2024; 7:30 pm, ESPN+ | | Lindenwood | L 68–74 | 6–11 (1–3) | Show Me Center (1,175); Cape Girardeau, MO |
| January 13, 2024; 3:00 pm, ESPN+ | | at Tennessee Tech | L 59–70 | 6–12 (1–4) | Eblen Center (1,210); Cookeville, TN |
| January 20, 2024; 3:45 pm, ESPN+ | | SIU Edwardsville | W 52–47 | 7–12 (2–4) | Show Me Center (2,142); Cape Girardeau, MO |
| January 25, 2024; 7:30 pm, ESPN+ | | at UT Martin | L 58–84 | 7–13 (2–5) | Skyhawk Arena (1,521); Martin, TN |
| January 27, 2024; 3:00 pm, ESPN+ | | at Little Rock | L 61–66 | 7–14 (2–6) | Jack Stephens Center (1,356); Little Rock, AR |
| January 30, 2024; 7:30 pm, ESPN+ | | at Lindenwood | L 54–58 | 7–15 (2–7) | Hyland Performance Arena (1,986); St. Charles, MO |
| February 3, 2024; 3:45 pm, ESPN+ | | Western Illinois | L 55–76 | 7–16 (2–8) | Show Me Center (1,060); Cape Girardeau, MO |
| February 8, 2024; 7:30 pm, ESPN+ | | Tennessee Tech | W 88–69 | 8–16 (3–8) | Show Me Center (1,056); Cape Girardeau, MO |
| February 10, 2024; 3:45 pm, ESPN+ | | Tennessee State | L 74–77 | 8–17 (3–9) | Show Me Center (1,134); Cape Girardeau, MO |
| February 15, 2024; 7:30 pm, ESPN+ | | at Eastern Illinois | L 57–75 | 8–18 (3–10) | Groniger Arena (1,369); Charleston, IL |
| February 17, 2024; 3:30 pm, ESPN+ | | at SIU Edwardsville | L 76–80 | 8–19 (3–11) | First Community Arena (2,233); Edwardsville, IL |
| February 22, 2024; 7:30 pm, ESPN+ | | Little Rock | L 61–83 | 8–20 (3–12) | Show Me Center (1,013); Cape Girardeau, MO |
| February 24, 2024; 3:45 pm, ESPN+ | | UT Martin | L 72–82 | 8–21 (3–13) | Show Me Center (1,367); Cape Girardeau, MO |
| February 29, 2024; 6:00 pm, ESPN+ | | at Morehead State | L 50–72 | 8–22 (3–14) | Ellis Johnson Arena (3,105); Morehead, KY |
| March 2, 2024; 7:30 pm, ESPN+ | | at Southern Indiana | W 70–66 | 9–22 (4–14) | Screaming Eagles Arena (1,871); Evansville, IN |
*Non-conference game. ^{#}Rankings from AP Poll. (#) Tournament seedings in parentheses. All times are in Central.
