= 2023–24 Lindenwood Lions men's basketball team =

American college basketball season

2023–24 Lindenwood Lions men's basketball
- Conference: Ohio Valley Conference
- Record: 9–22 (3–15 OVC)
- Head coach: Kyle Gerdeman (5th season)
- Associate head coach: Anthony Beane
- Assistant coaches: Kyle Campbell; Brandon Shingles; Scott Gauthier
- Home arena: Hyland Performance Arena

2023–24 Ohio Valley Conference men's basketball standings
	Conf.				Overall
Team	W		L	PCT	W		L	PCT
Little Rock	14	–	4	.778	21	–	13	.618
UT Martin	14	–	4	.778	21	–	11	.656
Morehead State †	14	–	4	.778	26	–	9	.743
Western Illinois	13	–	5	.722	21	–	12	.636
Tennessee State	10	–	8	.556	18	–	15	.545
SIU Edwardsville	9	–	9	.500	17	–	16	.515
Eastern Illinois	8	–	10	.444	14	–	18	.438
Southern Indiana*	5	–	13	.278	8	–	24	.250
Tennessee Tech	5	–	13	.278	10	–	21	.323
Southeast Missouri State	4	–	14	.222	9	–	22	.290
Lindenwood*	3	–	15	.167	9	–	22	.290
† 2024 OVC tournament winner * ineligible for the 2024 NCAA tournament due to transition period

The 2023–24 Lindenwood Lions men's basketball team represented Lindenwood University during the 2023–24 NCAA Division I men's basketball season. The Lions, led by fifth-year head coach Kyle Gerdeman, played their home games at the Hyland Performance Arena in St. Charles, Missouri as members of the Ohio Valley Conference (OVC). They finished the season 9–22, 3–15 in OVC play, to finish in last place. They failed to qualify for the OVC tournament.

This season marked Lindenwood's second year of a four-year transition period from Division II to Division I. As a result, the Lions are not eligible for NCAA postseason play until the 2026–27 season.

== Previous season ==
The Lions finished the 2022–23 season 11–21, 6–12 in OVC play, to finish tied for eighth place. They were defeated by Southeast Missouri State in the first round of the OVC tournament.

== Roster ==
2023–24 Lindenwood Lions men's basketball team
Players
Coaches

Pos.	#	Name	Height	Weight	Year	Hometown
F	0	David Ware	6 ft 5 in (1.96 m)	210 lb (95 kg)	Sr	Milford, VA
G	1	Colin Ruffin	6 ft 4 in (1.93 m)	193 lb (88 kg)	Fr	Nixa, MO
G	3	Tommie Williams	6 ft 4 in (1.93 m)	185 lb (84 kg)	RS So	Belleville, IL
F	4	Jordan Wildy	6 ft 9 in (2.06 m)	200 lb (91 kg)	Jr	Rock Hill, SC
F	5	Jaylon McDaniel	6 ft 7 in (2.01 m)	231 lb (105 kg)	Jr	Kansas City, MO
G	10	RJ Horry	5 ft 9 in (1.75 m)	—	Fr	O'Fallon, MO
G	11	Amoro Lado	6 ft 3 in (1.91 m)	190 lb (86 kg)	Sr	Cairo, Egypt
F	13	Keith II Haymon	6 ft 7 in (2.01 m)	210 lb (95 kg)	GS	Houston, TX
G	15	Nathan Jr. Johnson	6 ft 3 in (1.91 m)	208 lb (94 kg)	Jr	Kansas City, KS
G	20	Brayden Wampler-Foust	6 ft 3 in (1.91 m)	190 lb (86 kg)	RS So	St. Charles, MO
F	22	Isaac Ondekane	6 ft 8 in (2.03 m)	275 lb (125 kg)	Jr	Kinshasa, DR Congo
G	23	Jeremiah Talton	6 ft 6 in (1.98 m)	190 lb (86 kg)	So	Quincy, IL
F	24	Keenon Cole	6 ft 7 in (2.01 m)	215 lb (98 kg)	Sr	Streamwood, IL
G	25	Darius Beane	6 ft 3 in (1.91 m)	175 lb (79 kg)	RS Sr	Carbondale, IL

Head coach

- Kyle Gerdeman (Southeast Missouri State)

Assistant coach(es)

- Anthony Beane (Kansas State)
- Kyle Campbell (Hastings)
- Brandon Shingles (Morehead State)
- Scott Gauthier (Missouri)

Legend

- (C) Team captain
- (S) Suspended
- (I) Ineligible
- (W) Walk-on
- Injured
- Current redshirt

Roster
Last update: November 28, 2023

== Schedule and results ==
Date time, TV	Rank^{#}	Opponent^{#}	Result	Record	Site (attendance) city, state
Non-conference regular season
November 6, 2023*; 7:00 p.m., B1G+		at Nebraska	L 52–84	0–1	Pinnacle Bank Arena (13,478); Lincoln, NE
November 9, 2023*; 7:00 p.m., ESPN+		at Iowa State	L 47–102	0–2	Hilton Coliseum (13,327); Ames, IA
November 13, 2023*; 7:00 p.m., ESPN+		Hannibal–LaGrange	W 83–52	1–2	Hyland Performance Arena (957); St. Charles, MO
November 16, 2023*; 5:30 p.m.		at Air Force; Air Force Classic	L 58–76	1–3	Clune Arena (1,209); Colorado Springs, CO
November 17, 2023*; 3:00 p.m.		vs. Omaha; Air Force Classic	W 72–70	2–3	Clune Arena (321); Colorado Springs, CO
November 19, 2023*; 12:30 p.m.		vs. William & Mary; Air Force Classic	W 71–60	3–3	Clune Arena (126); Colorado Springs, CO
November 27, 2023*; 7:00 p.m., ESPN+		Utah Tech	L 66–73	3–4	Hyland Performance Arena (747); St. Charles, MO
December 2, 2023*; 7:00 p.m., ESPN+		at Idaho State	L 70–76	3–5	Reed Gym (1,244); Pocatello, ID
December 9, 2023*; 3:30 p.m., ESPN+		Kansas City	L 67–72	3–6	Hyland Performance Arena (678); St. Charles, MO
December 12, 2023*; 7:00 p.m., ESPN+		Avila	W 81–64	4–6	Hyland Performance Arena (328); St. Charles, MO
December 16, 2023*; 11:00 a.m., ESPN+		at IUPUI	W 73–67	5–6	Indiana Farmers Coliseum (619); Indianapolis, IN
December 19, 2023*; 7:00 p.m., ESPN+		at Missouri State	L 57–79	5–7	Great Southern Bank Arena (2,031); Springfield, MO
December 22, 2023*; 6:00 p.m., ESPN+		Rockford	W 81–54	6–7	Hyland Performance Arena (524); St. Charles, MO
OVC regular season
December 31, 2023; 2:30 p.m., ESPN+		Southern Indiana	L 62–73	6–8 (0–1)	Hyland Performance Arena (2,158); St. Charles, MO
January 6, 2024; 2:30 p.m., ESPN+		at Western Illinois	L 57–68	6–9 (0–2)	Western Hall (601); Macomb, IL
January 11, 2024; 7:30 p.m., ESPN+		at Southeast Missouri State	W 74–68	7–9 (1–2)	Show Me Center (1,175); Cape Girardeau, MO
January 13, 2024; 3:30 p.m., ESPN+		at Tennessee State	L 60–75	7–10 (1–3)	Gentry Complex (379); Nashville, TN
January 18, 2024; 7:30 p.m., ESPN+		SIU Edwardsville	L 59–78	7–11 (1–4)	Hyland Performance Arena (1,856); St. Charles, MO
January 20, 2024; 3:30 p.m., ESPN+		Eastern Illinois	L 68–78	7–12 (1–5)	Hyland Performance Arena (1,261); St. Charles, MO
January 25, 2024; 6:30 p.m., ESPN+		at Little Rock	L 66–80	7–13 (1–6)	Jack Stephens Center (1,189); Little Rock, AR
January 27, 2024; 3:30 p.m., ESPN+		at UT Martin	L 67–76	7–14 (1–7)	Skyhawk Arena (1,087); Martin, TN
January 30, 2024; 7:30 p.m., ESPN+		Southeast Missouri State	W 58–54	8–14 (2–7)	Hyland Performance Arena (1,986); St. Charles, MO
February 1, 2024; 7:30 p.m., ESPN+		Western Illinois	L 71–79	8–15 (2–8)	Hyland Performance Arena (1,069); St. Charles, MO
February 8, 2024; 7:30 p.m., ESPN+		Tennessee State	L 55–65	8–16 (2–9)	Hyland Performance Arena (2,002); St. Charles, MO
February 10, 2024; 3:30 p.m., ESPN+		Tennessee Tech	L 53–62 ^{OT}	8–17 (2–10)	Hyland Performance Arena (1,165); St. Charles, MO
February 15, 2024; 7:30 p.m., ESPN+		at SIU Edwardsville	L 63–91	8–18 (2–11)	First Community Arena (2,036); Edwardsville, IL
February 17, 2024; 3:30 p.m., ESPN+		at Eastern Illinois	L 57–72	8–19 (2–12)	Groniger Arena (1,611); Charleston, IL
February 22, 2024; 7:30 p.m., ESPN+		UT Martin	L 82–106	8–20 (2–13)	Hyland Performance Arena (1,019); St. Charles, MO
February 24, 2024; 3:30 p.m., ESPN+		Little Rock	L 73–82	8–21 (2–14)	Hyland Performance Arena (1,113); St. Charles, MO
February 29, 2024; 7:30 p.m., ESPN+		at Southern Indiana	W 67–63	9–21 (3–14)	Screaming Eagles Arena (1,418); Evansville, IN
March 2, 2024; 2:00 p.m., ESPN+		at Morehead State	L 49–67	9–22 (3–15)	Ellis Johnson Arena (2,777); Morehead, KY
*Non-conference game. ^{#}Rankings from AP poll. (#) Tournament seedings in parentheses. All times are in Central.
