= Riley Minix =

American basketball player (born 2000)

Free agent
- Position: Small forward

Personal information
- Born: September 22, 2000 (age 26) Vero Beach, Florida, U.S.
- Listed height: 6 ft 7 in (2.01 m)
- Listed weight: 230 lb (104 kg)

Career information
- High school: Vero Beach (Vero Beach, Florida)
- College: Southeastern (2019–2023); Morehead State (2023–2024)
- NBA draft: 2024: undrafted
- Playing career: 2024–present

Career history
- 2024–2025: San Antonio Spurs
- 2024–2025: →Austin Spurs
- 2026: Cleveland Charge
- 2026: Cleveland Cavaliers
- 2026: →Cleveland Charge

Career highlights
- OVC Player of the Year (2024); First-team All-OVC (2024); OVC All-Newcomer team (2024); OVC Tournament MVP (2024); 2× First-team NAIA All-American (2022, 2023); 2× Sun Conference Player of the Year (2022, 2023); 3× First-team All-Sun Conference (2020, 2022, 2023); Sun Conference Freshman of the Year (2020); Academic All-American of the Year (2023); Second-team Academic All-American (2024)
- Stats at NBA.com
- Stats at Basketball Reference

Riley James Minix (born September 22, 2000) is an American professional basketball player who last played for the Cleveland Cavaliers of the National Basketball Association (NBA), on a two-way contract with the Cleveland Charge of the NBA G League. He played college basketball for the Southeastern Fire and the Morehead State Eagles.

== High school career ==
Minix played high school basketball for Vero Beach High School in Vero Beach, Florida. He experienced a growth spurt before his senior season, where he broke out, averaging 17.4 points and 7.6 rebounds per game.

== College career ==
He committed to NAIA school Southeastern University and was named first-team All-Sun Conference and conference freshman of the year his first season. In his sophomore year, he suffered an upper-body injury after eight games, sidelining him for the rest of the season. in his next two seasons, Minix was named both a first-team All-American and the Sun Conference Player of the Year. Following his four years at Southeastern, Minix chose to take advantage of the extra year given to players due to the interference of the COVID-19 pandemic to transfer to NCAA Division I, ultimately choosing the Morehead State Eagles.

In his lone season at Morehead State, Minix finished in the top ten in the Ohio Valley Conference (OVC) in scoring, rebounding, field goal percentage, free throw percentage, blocks, and steals. He also led the conference with 18 double-doubles. At the close of the season, he was named the OVC Player of the Year and a member of the All-OVC first team and All-Newcomer team.

== Professional career ==
=== San Antonio / Austin Spurs (2024–2026) ===
After going undrafted in the 2024 NBA draft, Minix joined the San Antonio Spurs for the 2024 NBA Summer League and on July 20, 2024, he signed with the team. On October 19, he signed a two-way contract with the Spurs. During his rookie season, Minix played in only one game for San Antonio, a 100–127 loss against the Houston Rockets on November 26 in which he recorded two rebounds and missed his only shot attempt.

Minix would spend the first half of the 2024–25 season with the Austin Spurs of the NBA G League. For the Tip - Off Tournament from November 8 to December 22, Minix would instantly be a contributing starter for the club. Averaging 20.5 points, 6.9 rebounds and 2.3 assists in 33 minutes per game. Minix scored in double figures in all 16 games, and scored more than 20 points in 8 of those 16 games, helping them to a 10 - 6 record. For the Austin Spurs, regular season, Minix would only play in the team's first 3 games and averaged 12.7 points, 4.7 rebounds and 1.3 assists in 24 minutes per game.

After missing the Austin Spurs' next 5 games from January 3 to January 11, on January 15, 2025, it was announced that Minix would miss the remainder of the season after undergoing surgery to repair a torn labrum in his left shoulder.

On August 6, 2025, Minix re-signed with the Spurs on a two-way contract. He made three appearances for San Antonio, averaging 3.0 points, 0.7 rebounds, and 0.3 assists. Minix was waived on December 12, following the signing of Kyle Mangas.

=== Cleveland Cavaliers / Charge (2026) ===
On January 14, 2026, the Cleveland Charge announced that they had acquired rights to Minix from Austin Spurs in a three-team trade. On February 13, the Cleveland Cavaliers announced that they had signed Minix to a two-way contract.

== Career statistics ==
Legend
| GP | Games played | GS | Games started | MPG | Minutes per game |
| FG% | Field goal percentage | 3P% | 3-point field goal percentage | FT% | Free throw percentage |
| RPG | Rebounds per game | APG | Assists per game | SPG | Steals per game |
| BPG | Blocks per game | PPG | Points per game | **Bold** | Career high |

=== NBA ===
| Year | Team | GP | GS | MPG | FG% | 3P% | FT% | RPG | APG | SPG | BPG | PPG |
|---|---|---|---|---|---|---|---|---|---|---|---|---|
| 2024–25 | San Antonio | 1 | 0 | 7.0 | .000 | .000 | – | **2.0** | .0 | .0 | .0 | .0 |
| 2025–26 | San Antonio | 3 | 0 | 2.7 | **.667** | **.333** | – | .7 | .3 | **.3** | .0 | 3.0 |
| 2025–26 | Cleveland | **6** | 0 | **8.3** | .588 | **.333** | **1.000** | .7 | **.7** | .2 | **.2** | **4.3** |
| 2026–27 | Cleveland | 4 | 0 | 13.8 | .294 | .182 | – | **2.0** | .0 | .0 | .0 | 3.0 |
| Career | | 14 | 0 | 8.6 | .463 | .250 | 1.000 | .9 | .5 | .2 | .7 | 3.4 |

=== College ===
==== NCAA Division I ====
| Year | Team | GP | GS | MPG | FG% | 3P% | FT% | RPG | APG | SPG | BPG | PPG |
|---|---|---|---|---|---|---|---|---|---|---|---|---|
| 2023–24 | Morehead State | 35 | 35 | 33.8 | .541 | .349 | .839 | 9.7 | 2.2 | 1.3 | 1.0 | 20.9 |

==== NAIA ====
| Year | Team | GP | GS | MPG | FG% | 3P% | FT% | RPG | APG | SPG | BPG | PPG |
|---|---|---|---|---|---|---|---|---|---|---|---|---|
| 2019–20 | Southeastern | **31** | 16 | 25.9 | .500 | .410 | .773 | 7.6 | .9 | 1.4 | .9 | 14.6 |
| 2020–21 | Southeastern | 10 | 9 | 26.1 | .535 | **.484** | **.818** | 9.1 | 1.6 | **1.7** | 1.0 | 20.3 |
| 2021–22 | Southeastern | 30 | **30** | 29.5 | .530 | .406 | .756 | 11.3 | 2.3 | 1.2 | 1.2 | 22.7 |
| 2022–23 | Southeastern | 28 | 28 | **37.2** | **.588** | .376 | .802 | **13.6** | **2.5** | 1.2 | **2.3** | **25.4** |
| Career | | 99 | 83 | 30.2 | .543 | .408 | .782 | 10.6 | 1.8 | 1.3 | 1.4 | 20.7 |
