= James Madison Dukes men's basketball =

Intercollegiate men's basketball program

2026–27 James Madison Dukes men's basketball team
- University: James Madison University
- Head coach: Preston Spradlin (3rd season)
- Location: Harrisonburg, Virginia
- Arena: Atlantic Union Bank Center (capacity: 8,500)
- Conference: Sun Belt Conference (American by 2027–28)
- Nickname: Dukes
- Colors: Purple and gold
- Student section: Electric Zoo

NCAA Division I tournament round of 32
- 1976*, 1981, 1982, 1983, 2024

NCAA Division I tournament appearances
- 1974*, 1976*, 1981, 1982, 1983, 1994, 2013, 2024

Conference tournament champions
- 1981, 1983, 1994, 2013, 2024

Conference regular-season champions
- 1981, 1982, 1990, 1991, 1992, 1993, 1994, 2000, 2015, 2021, 2025

Uniforms
Home	Away
- * at Division II level

The James Madison Dukes men's basketball team is the intercollegiate men's basketball program representing James Madison University in Harrisonburg, Virginia. The school, a member of Division I of the National Collegiate Athletic Association, joined the Sun Belt Conference on July 1, 2022, after having been a member of the Colonial Athletic Association since that league's establishment in 1979. The Dukes are led by head coach Preston Spradlin. The Dukes play their home games at the on-campus Atlantic Union Bank Center which seats 8,500 fans and opened in November 2020. The Dukes have appeared six times in the NCAA tournament, most recently in 2024. Beginning no later than July 1, 2028 the Dukes will begin play in the American Athletic Conference.

== History ==
The James Madison Dukes men's basketball team was founded in 1945, but was not a fully developed program until the late 1960s as James Madison University became a fully coeducational institution. The 1969–1970 season was the first as a varsity intercollegiate program. The Dukes were led by Cleve Branscum during the team's first two seasons, compiling a record of 20–17. The program was guided by new Administrative Director Dean Ehlers for the 1971–1972 season. Ehlers hired Lou Campanelli following the season, but remained at James Madison as the A.D. until 1993.

=== Lou Campanelli era ===
Taking over as the James Madison head coach in 1972, Lou Campanelli led the Dukes program for thirteen years (1972–1985). Campanelli coached the Dukes to two NCAA Division II basketball tournaments and then three NCAA Division I basketball tournaments after the school transitioned from Division II to Division I. In the Dukes' first ever appearance in the NCAA Division I tournament in 1981, Campanelli coached the team to a win over Georgetown. The Dukes would win a game in each of the Dukes’ following appearances in the NCAA Division I tournament under Campanelli, and lost by two points to eventual national champions University of North Carolina in the second round of the 1982 tournament.

Lou Campanelli was hired as the head coach at California in 1985. Campanelli finished at James Madison with a record of 238–118.

=== John Thurston era ===
John Thurston was hired as the fourth head coach of the James Madison Dukes men's basketball team in 1985. Prior to this, Thurston had served as an assistant coach under Campanelli with the Dukes since 1975. Thurston successfully turned the program around in his second season at the helm, guiding the Dukes to a 20–10 record, a berth in the National Invitation Tournament, and was named Colonial Athletic Association Coach of the Year. However, with a 6–11 start to the 1988 season, James Madison University President Ronald E. Carrier announced that Thurston's contract would not be renewed at the end of the season and Thurston resigned hours later. The Dukes replaced Thurston with interim head coach Tom McCorry to finish the 1988 season.

=== Lefty Driesell era ===
In 1988, the Dukes hired former Davidson and Maryland head coach Lefty Driesell to lead the program. Driesell led the Dukes for nine seasons, compiling a record of 159–111, winning 5 straight CCA regular season titles, and taking the Dukes to the NCAA tournament in 1994.

=== Sherman Dillard era ===
In 1997, James Madison hired Sherman Dillard to lead the men's basketball program. Sherman Dillard played basketball at James Madison under Lou Campanelli from 1973 to 1978. Prior to accepting the position at JMU, he had been the coach at Indiana State. He led the Dukes through the 2004 season, guiding the program to one regular season title in 2000 and compiling a record of 93–106.

=== Dean Keener era ===
The Dukes hired Dean Keener in 2004 to be the program's next men's basketball head coach. Keener came from Georgia Tech, where he was an assistant on the 2004 National Runner-Up team. He had also been a one time assistant coach at JMU under Sherman Dillard for the 1999–2000 season.

Under Keener, the Dukes compiled a record of 31–85. During the 2008 season, Keener resigned as the head coach, but he led the team through the end of the season.

=== Matt Brady era ===
James Madison hired Matt Brady to be the head coach of the men's basketball program in 2008. In his first season, Brady led the Dukes to an 18-win regular season and earned the program's first postseason berth since 1994 in the newly created CollegeInsider.com Postseason Tournament.

Under Brady in 2013, the Dukes won their first CAA tournament since 1994, earning a berth in the NCAA tournament. As a 16 seed, the Dukes defeated Long Island in the First Four before being defeated by Indiana in the second round.

Matt Brady led the Dukes to a share of the regular season CAA title in 2015 but the Dukes did not win the CAA Tournament and were invited to the CIT tournament. Brady was fired following the 2016 season, despite winning 21 games.

=== Louis Rowe era ===
In 2016, James Madison hired JMU men's basketball alumnus and former assistant coach Louis Rowe to be the program's tenth men's basketball coach. Rowe led the Dukes for four seasons before being let go at the end of the 2020 season. Under Rowe, the Dukes compiled a record of 43–85.

=== Mark Byington era ===
In March 2020, James Madison hired Mark Byington to lead the Dukes men's basketball team. Before coming to JMU, Byington was the head coach at Georgia Southern. In his first season at JMU, Mark Byington lead the Dukes to a share of the regular season title, the team's first since the 2015 season.

In the first season of his tenure at James Madison, the Dukes opened their new on-campus arena, the Atlantic Union Bank Center.

On December 7, 2021, Byington's Dukes defeated Virginia for the first time in program history in front of a sold-out home crowd.

The 2023–24 season started with a road wins at Michigan State and Kent State, both of which broke home winning streaks held by the teams. The Dukes followed up those wins with a win at home over Howard, propelling the Dukes into the AP Top 25 for the first time in program history. On December 9, 2023, the team broke their record for best start to a season by defeating Old Dominion University to start 9–0. After a 14–0 start to the season, the best start in program history, the Dukes dropped their first game of the season on January 6 at Southern Miss. The Dukes won the 2024 Sun Belt Conference men's basketball tournament, securing an automatic bid to the 2024 NCAA Division I men's basketball tournament. As the 12 seed in the South region, the Dukes upset 5 seed Wisconsin in the First Round, before losing to Duke in the Second Round. This was the first time that the Dukes advanced to the Second Round of the NCAA Tournament since the 1993-94 season. The Dukes finished the 2023–24 season with a record of 32–4, the best in program history.

Following the Dukes' loss in the NCAA Tournament, Mark Byington accepted the head coach position at Vanderbilt. Byington guided the Dukes to an 82–36 record across his four seasons as head coach.

=== Preston Spradlin era ===
On March 29, 2024, James Madison hired Preston Spradlin as the new head coach of the men's basketball team. Spradlin previously led the Morehead State Eagles for eight seasons.

== Rivalries ==
Historically, James Madison's rivals had been in-state members of the Colonial Athletic Association: William & Mary, VCU, George Mason, Old Dominion, and Richmond. Now members of the Sun Belt Conference, the Dukes only remaining conference rival from the old CAA is Old Dominion. However, James Madison has continued to schedule its former conference rivals in non-conference play. James Madison and Old Dominion's basketball rivalry is also a part of their all-sports rivalry known as the Royal Rivalry.

=== James Madison vs. In-State NCAA Division I Schools ===
School	Record	First Meeting	Last Meeting
George Mason	48–48	1970	2021
Hampton	6–1	1995	2023
Liberty	7–2	1980	2009
Longwood	6–2	2005	2016
Norfolk State	2–2	1998	2020
Old Dominion	33–58	1972	2024
Radford	16–4	1984	2023
Richmond	22–34	1980	2017
Virginia	1–12	1977	2022
VCU	22–44	1971	2020
VMI	14–7	1973	2007
Virginia Tech	4–10	1978	2006
William & Mary	52–50	1978	2022

=== James Madison vs. Sun Belt Members ===
This reflects the Dukes' record against the current Sun Belt Conference's membership as of the 2023–24 season.

School	Record	First Meeting	Last Meeting
Appalachian State	3–7	2002	2024
Arkansas State	4–0	1993	2024
Coastal Carolina	5–0	1987	2024
Georgia Southern	3–1	2023	2024
Georgia State	9–9	1976	2024
Louisiana	2–1	2016	2024
Louisiana–Monroe	2–0	2023	2024
Marshall	7–2	2010	2024
Old Dominion	33–58	1972	2024
South Alabama	3–4	1976	2024
Southern Miss	0–2	2023	2024
Texas State	2–1	2023	2024
Troy	1–0	2023	2023

=== James Madison vs. CAA Members ===
James Madison also maintained competitive series against the other members of the Colonial Athletic Association during their tenure in the CAA.

School	Record	First Meeting	Last Meeting
Charleston	7–11	2007	2022
Delaware	13–23	2002	2022
Drexel	16–26	1995	2022
Elon	9–10	1975	2022
Hofstra	15–24	2002	2022
Northeastern	10–23	1977	2022
Towson	37–21	1979	2022
UNC Wilmington	37–43	1979	2022
William & Mary	52–50	1978	2022

== Postseason results ==
=== NCAA Division I tournament results ===
The Dukes have appeared in the NCAA Division I tournament six times. Their combined record is 5–6.

Year	Round	Seed	Opponent	Result
1981	First Round; Second Round	#10	#7 Georgetown #2 Notre Dame	W 61–55; L 45–54
1982	First Round; Second Round	#9	#8 Ohio State #1 North Carolina	W 55–48; L 50–52
1983	First Round; Second Round	#10	#7 West Virginia #2 North Carolina	W 57–50; L 49–68
1994	First Round	#14	#3 Florida	L 62–64
2013	First Four; Second Round (Note: Following the introduction of the First Four round in 2011, the Round of 64 was referred to as the Second Round instead of the First Round from 2011 to 2015.)	#16	#16 Long Island #1 Indiana	W 68–55; L 62–83
2024	First Round; Second Round	#12	#5 Wisconsin #4 Duke	W 72–61; L 55–93

=== NCAA Division II tournament results ===
The Dukes have appeared in the NCAA Division II tournament twice. Their record is 0–3.

Year	Round	Opponent	Result
1974	First round	Fisk	L 54–59
1976	Regional semifinals Regional 3rd-place game	Old Dominion; Morgan State	L 77–86; L 81–86

=== NIT results ===
The Dukes have appeared in the National Invitation Tournament (NIT) five times. Their combined record is 0–5.

Year	Round	Opponent	Result
1987	First round	Stephen F. Austin	L 63–70
1990	First round	New Orleans	L 74–78
1991	First round	Providence	L 93–98
1992	First round	Rutgers	L 69–73
1993	First round	Providence	L 61–73

=== CBI results ===
The Dukes have appeared in the College Basketball Invitational (CBI) once. Their record is 0–1.

Year	Round	Opponent	Result
2011	First round	Davidson	L 65–85

=== CIT results ===
The Dukes have appeared in the CollegeInsider.com Postseason Tournament (CIT) twice. Their record is 2–2.

Year	Round	Opponent	Result
2009	First round Quarterfinals; Semifinals	Mount St. Mary's; Liberty; Old Dominion	W 69–58; W 88–65; L 43–81
2015	First round	USC Upstate	L 72–73
