= 2023–24 Little Rock Trojans men's basketball team =

American college basketball season

2023–24 Little Rock Trojans men's basketball
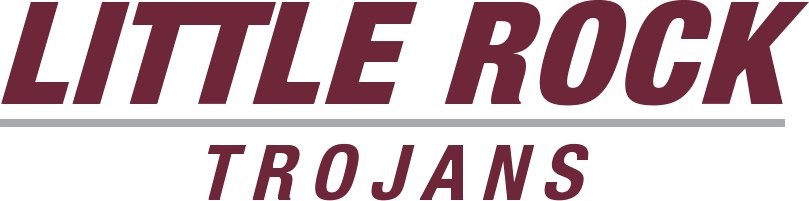

Ohio Valley regular season co-champions

CBI, First Round
- Conference: Ohio Valley Conference
- Record: 21–13 (14–4 OVC)
- Head coach: Darrell Walker (6th season)
- Assistant coaches: Charles Baker; Preston Laird; Julius Hodge
- Home arena: Jack Stephens Center

2023–24 Ohio Valley Conference men's basketball standings
	Conf.				Overall
Team	W		L	PCT	W		L	PCT
Little Rock	14	–	4	.778	21	–	13	.618
UT Martin	14	–	4	.778	21	–	11	.656
Morehead State †	14	–	4	.778	26	–	9	.743
Western Illinois	13	–	5	.722	21	–	12	.636
Tennessee State	10	–	8	.556	18	–	15	.545
SIU Edwardsville	9	–	9	.500	17	–	16	.515
Eastern Illinois	8	–	10	.444	14	–	18	.438
Southern Indiana*	5	–	13	.278	8	–	24	.250
Tennessee Tech	5	–	13	.278	10	–	21	.323
Southeast Missouri State	4	–	14	.222	9	–	22	.290
Lindenwood*	3	–	15	.167	9	–	22	.290
† 2024 OVC tournament winner * ineligible for the 2024 NCAA tournament due to transition period

The 2023–24 Little Rock Trojans men's basketball team represented the University of Arkansas at Little Rock during the 2023–24 NCAA Division I men's basketball season. The Trojans, led by sixth-year head coach Darrell Walker, played their home games at the Jack Stephens Center located in Little Rock, Arkansas, as second-year members of the Ohio Valley Conference.

== Previous season ==
The Trojans finished the 2022–23 season 10–21, 6–12 in OVC play to finish in ninth place. They failed to qualify for the OVC Tournament.

== Roster ==
2023–24 Little Rock Trojans men's basketball team
Players
Coaches

Pos.	#	Name	Height	Weight	Year	Hometown
G	0	Christian Hughes	6 ft 2 in (1.88 m)	180 lb (82 kg)	Fr	Kirkwood, Missouri
F	1	DeAntoni Gordon	6 ft 8 in (2.03 m)	220 lb (100 kg)	GS	Mobile, Alabama
G	2	KK Robinson	6 ft 0 in (1.83 m)	180 lb (82 kg)	Sr	Little Rock, Arkansas
G	3	Bradley Douglas	6 ft 1 in (1.85 m)	180 lb (82 kg)	Jr	Eustis, Florida
F	4	Creed Williamson	6 ft 8 in (2.03 m)	230 lb (104 kg)	Fr	Little Rock, Arkansas
F	5	Jaylen Crocker-Johnson	6 ft 8 in (2.03 m)	230 lb (104 kg)	Fr	San Antonio, Texas
G	7	Pavle Kuzmanovic	6 ft 5 in (1.96 m)	190 lb (86 kg)	Sr	Loznica, Serbia
G	8	Shota Abashidze	5 ft 11 in (1.8 m)	150 lb (68 kg)	So	Tbilisi, Georgia
G	11	Cougar Downing	6 ft 1 in (1.85 m)	175 lb (79 kg)	Sr	Olathe, Kansas
G	12	Jordan Jefferson	6 ft 4 in (1.93 m)	180 lb (82 kg)	Jr	Marietta, Georgia
G	13	Kristiyan Popov	6 ft 7 in (2.01 m)	200 lb (91 kg)	Fr	Varna, Bulgaria
F	19	Nikola Milosevic	6 ft 11 in (2.11 m)	225 lb (102 kg)	Fr	Belgrade, Serbia
G	20	Marcus Golden	6 ft 1 in (1.85 m)	180 lb (82 kg)	RS Fr	Clearwater, Florida
F	21	Ante Beljan	6 ft 8 in (2.03 m)	220 lb (100 kg)	So	Trogir, Croatia
F/C	22	Makhel Mitchell	6 ft 10 in (2.08 m)	240 lb (109 kg)	Sr	Washington, D.C.
G	24	Jamir Chaplin	6 ft 5 in (1.96 m)	200 lb (91 kg)	GS	Norcross, Georgia

Head coach

- Darrell Walker (Arkansas)

Assistant coach(es)

- Charles Baker (Eastern Kentucky)
- Preston Laird (Memphis)
- Julius Hodge (NC State)

Legend

- (C) Team captain
- (S) Suspended
- (I) Ineligible
- (W) Walk-on
- Injured
- Current redshirt

Roster
Last update: November 27, 2023

== Schedule and results ==
Date time, TV	Rank^{#}	Opponent^{#}	Result	Record	High points	High rebounds	High assists	Site (attendance) city, state
Exhibition
October 25, 2023*; 7:00 pm		Arkansas Baptist	W 97–66		–	–	–	Jack Stephens Center (5,199); Little Rock, AR
Non-conference regular season
November 6, 2023*; 7:00 pm, ESPN+		Texas State	W 71–66	1–0	24 – Robinson	8 – Gordon	4 – Robinson	Jack Stephens Center (2,146); Little Rock, AR
November 10, 2022*; 7:30 pm, ESPN+		at UIC	L 71–86	1–1	19 – Gordon	10 – Chaplin	3 – Tied	Credit Union 1 Arena (2,593); Chicago, IL
November 18, 2023*; 1:00 pm		vs. Northern Illinois; Capitol Challenge	L 93–98	1–2	26 – Gordon	6 – Gordon	8 – Robinson	GSU Convocation Center (1,188); Atlanta, GA
November 19, 2023*; 2:00 pm		at Georgia State; Capitol Challenge	L 77–88	1–3	22 – Chaplin	10 – Robinson	5 – Robinson	GSU Convocation Center (1,451); Atlanta, GA
November 22, 2023*; 12:00 pm, ESPN+		Georgia State	L 90–93 ^{OT}	1–4	26 – Robinson	11 – Chaplin	7 – Robinson	Jack Stephens Center (737); Little Rock, AR
November 25, 2023*; 2:00 pm, ESPN+		Tulsa	W 84–82 ^{OT}	2–4	27 – Chaplin	15 – Chaplin	6 – Douglas	Jack Stephens Center (925); Little Rock, AR
November 28, 2023*; 6:30 pm, ESPN+		Ball State	W 90–64	3–4	26 – Douglas	8 – Chaplin	6 – Williamson	Jack Stephens Center (1,081); Little Rock, AR
December 1, 2023*; 6:30 pm, ESPN+		Arkansas State	W 77–66	4–4	18 – Downing	15 – Gordon	6 – Douglas	Jack Stephens Center (2,613); Little Rock, AR
December 7, 2023*; 6:30 pm, ESPN+		at Central Arkansas; I-40 Showdown	L 71–75	4–5	21 – Chaplin	15 – Crocker-Johnson	5 – Gordon	Farris Center (2,730); Conway, AR
December 10, 2023*; 12:00 pm, ESPN+		Winthrop	L 68–85	4–6	15 – Crocker-Johnson	9 – Crocker-Johnson	3 – Tied	Jack Stephens Center (387); Little Rock, AR
December 13, 2023*; 6:30 pm, ESPN+		UTSA	W 93–84	5–6	22 – Chaplin	7 – Douglas	3 – Tied	Jack Stephens Center; Little Rock, AR
December 18, 2023*; 6:30 pm, ESPN+		Murray State	W 80–66	6–6	16 – Robinson	14 – Robinson	5 – Douglas	Jack Stephens Center (832); Little Rock, AR
December 21, 2023*; 2:00 pm, ESPN+		Jacksonville State	L 60–90	6–7	14 – Robinson	10 – Crocker-Johnson	2 – Tied	Jack Stephens Center (1,256); Little Rock, AR
OVC regular season
December 28, 2023; 7:30 pm, ESPN+		at Tennessee Tech	W 81–75	7–7 (1–0)	25 – Chaplin	9 – Tied	4 – Tied	Eblen Center (1,111); Cookeville, TN
December 30, 2023; 3:30 pm, ESPN+		at Tennessee State	L 82–90	7–8 (1–1)	29 – Chaplin	9 – Chaplin	2 – Chaplin	Gentry Complex (493); Nashville, TN
January 4, 2024; 7:00 pm, ESPN+		SIU Edwardsville	W 88–80	8–8 (2–1)	19 – Gordon	10 – Robinson	12 – Robinson	Jack Stephens Center (1,011); Little Rock, AR
January 6, 2024; 3:00 pm, ESPN+		Eastern Illinois	L 88–90	8–9 (2–2)	19 – Chaplin	7 – Gordon	7 – Robinson	Jack Stephens Center (987); Little Rock, AR
January 13, 2024; 3:30 pm, ESPN+		at UT Martin	L 72–77	8–10 (2–3)	22 – Chaplin	7 – Robinson	5 – Mitchell	Skyhawk Arena (1,543); Martin, TN
January 18, 2024; 7:30 pm, ESPN+		at Southern Indiana	W 77–75	9–10 (3–3)	20 – Robinson	12 – Robinson	7 – Robinson	Screaming Eagles Arena (1,247); Evansville, IN
January 25, 2024; 6:30 pm, ESPN+		Lindenwood	W 80–66	10–10 (4–3)	22 – Chaplin	7 – Chaplin	6 – Robinson	Jack Stephens Center (1,189); Little Rock, AR
January 27, 2024; 3:00 pm, ESPN+		Southeast Missouri State	W 66–61	11–10 (5–3)	13 – Tied	10 – Crocker-Johnson	5 – Robinson	Jack Stephens Center (1,356); Little Rock, AR
February 1, 2024; 7:30 pm, ESPN+		at SIU Edwardsville	L 66–68	11–11 (5–4)	13 – Robinson	8 – Douglas	5 – Robinson	First Community Arena (1,254); Edwardsville, IL
February 3, 2024; 3:30 pm, ESPN+		at Eastern Illinois	W 71–47	12–11 (6–4)	14 – Tied	13 – Crocker-Johnson	6 – Crocker-Johnson	Groniger Arena (1,192); Charleston, IL
February 6, 2024; 7:00 pm, ESPN+		UT Martin	W 77–57	13–11 (7–4)	17 – Douglas	11 – Crocker-Johnson	3 – Tied	Jack Stephens Center (1,236); Little Rock, AR
February 8, 2024; 7:30 pm, ESPN+		at Western Illinois	W 63–60	14–11 (8–4)	23 – Robinson	7 – Chaplin	2 – Tied	Western Hall (1,076); Macomb, IL
February 15, 2024; 7:00 pm, ESPN+		Morehead State	W 69–68	15–11 (9–4)	21 – Robinson	7 – Tied	3 – Tied	Jack Stephens Center (2,102); Little Rock, AR
February 17, 2024; 3:00 pm, ESPN+		Southern Indiana	W 80–62	16–11 (10–4)	22 – Chaplin	11 – Mitchell	5 – Douglas	Jack Stephens Center (1,875); Little Rock, AR
February 22, 2024; 7:30 pm, ESPN+		at Southeast Missouri State	W 83–61	17–11 (11–4)	19 – Chaplin	11 – Chaplin	5 – Robinson	Show Me Center (1,013); Cape Girardeau, MO
February 24, 2024; 3:30 pm, ESPN+		at Lindenwood	W 82–73	18–11 (12–4)	21 – Mitchell	14 – Mitchell	5 – Tied	Hyland Performance Arena (1,113); St. Charles, MO
February 29, 2024; 7:00 pm, ESPN+		Tennessee State	W 85–60	19–11 (13–4)	22 – Jefferson	8 – Mitchell	5 – Mitchell	Jack Stephens Center (3,367); Little Rock, AR
March 2, 2024; 3:00 pm, ESPN+		Tennessee Tech	W 81–43	20–11 (14–4)	16 – Robinson	7 – Tied	6 – Mitchell	Jack Stephens Center (4,023); Little Rock, AR
OVC Tournament
March 8, 2024; 7:00 pm, ESPNU	(1)	vs. (4) Western Illinois; Semifinals	W 82–57	21–11	16 – Tied	7 – Tied	5 – Mitchell	Ford Center; Evansville, IN
March 9, 2024; 7:00 pm, ESPN2	(1)	vs. (3) Morehead State; Championship	L 55–69	21–12	14 – Douglas	6 – Chaplin	3 – Mitchell	Ford Center; Evansville, IN
CBI
March 24, 2024; 2:30 p.m., FloHoops	(10)	vs. (7) Fairfield; First round	L 75–82	21–13	20 – Jefferson	7 – Robinson	8 – Robinson	Ocean Center; Daytona Beach, FL
*Non-conference game. ^{#}Rankings from AP Poll. (#) Tournament seedings in parentheses. All times are in Central.
