= 2023–24 SIU Edwardsville Cougars men's basketball team =

American college basketball season

2023–24 SIU Edwardsville Cougars men's basketball
- Conference: Ohio Valley Conference
- Record: 17-16 (9-9 OVC)
- Head coach: Brian Barone (5th season)
- Assistant coaches: Colin Schneider (Associate Head Coach); Angres Thorpe; Darreon Reddick; Mike Waldo (Special Assistant to the Head Coach); Ryan Hellenthal (Director of Player Development and Basketball Administration)
- Home arena: First Community Arena

2023–24 Ohio Valley Conference men's basketball standings
	Conf.				Overall
Team	W		L	PCT	W		L	PCT
Little Rock	14	–	4	.778	21	–	13	.618
UT Martin	14	–	4	.778	21	–	11	.656
Morehead State †	14	–	4	.778	26	–	9	.743
Western Illinois	13	–	5	.722	21	–	12	.636
Tennessee State	10	–	8	.556	18	–	15	.545
SIU Edwardsville	9	–	9	.500	17	–	16	.515
Eastern Illinois	8	–	10	.444	14	–	18	.438
Southern Indiana*	5	–	13	.278	8	–	24	.250
Tennessee Tech	5	–	13	.278	10	–	21	.323
Southeast Missouri State	4	–	14	.222	9	–	22	.290
Lindenwood*	3	–	15	.167	9	–	22	.290
† 2024 OVC tournament winner * ineligible for the 2024 NCAA tournament due to transition period

The 2023–24 SIU Edwardsville Cougars men's basketball team represented Southern Illinois University Edwardsville in the 2023–24 NCAA Division I men's basketball season. The Cougars, led by fifth-year head coach Brian Barone, played their home games at the First Community Arena in Edwardsville, Illinois as members of the Ohio Valley Conference (OVC).

== Previous season ==
The Cougars finished the 2022-23 season 19–14, 9–9 in OVC play to finish in a tie for sixth place. As the No. 6 seed in the OVC tournament, they defeated Southern Indiana in the first round before losing to UT Martin.

SIUE guards Ray'Sean Taylor and Damarco Minor were honored as All-Ohio Valley Conference selections. Taylor was named to the All-OVC First Team, while Minor earned a spot on the OVC All-Newcomer Team.

== Season forecast ==
Nine players return from the 2022–23 squad. They are joined by one freshman, two transfers from junior colleges, and two transfers from other Division I programs.

In a vote of Ohio Valley Conference head men's basketball coaches and communication directors, SIUE was picked to finish 2nd in the 11 team Ohio Valley Conference.

2023-24 OVC Men's Basketball Predicted Order of Finish

1. Morehead State (20 first-place votes) – 200 points

2. SIUE - 162

3. Tennessee State (2) - 153

4. UT Martin - 149

5. Southeast Missouri - 124

6. Tennessee Tech - 120

7. Little Rock - 85

8. Western Illinois - 80

9. Southern Indiana - 63

10. Lindenwood - 40

11. Eastern Illinois - 34

Guards Ray’Sean Taylor and Damarco Minor and forward Shamar Wright were named to the 12 member 2023-24 Preseason All-OVC Men's Basketball Team.

== Regular season ==
In their non-conference schedule, the Cougars won all five home games and two neutral court games, but they lost all six road games.

In their conference schedule, the Cougars won seven and lost two at home but only won two while losing seven on the road. They finished sixth in the conference, earning the #6 seed for the OVC Tournament.

== Postseason ==
In voting by league head coaches and communications directors prior to the OVC Tournament, Cougar guard Damarco Minor who has averaged 15.7 points and 8.4 rebounds per game and who was an OVC All-Newcomer selection last year was named to the All OVC First Team.

In the first round of the OVC Tournament, the 6th seeded Cougars met seventh seed Eastern Illinois and won 68-57. They broke a 4-4 tie to take the lead, added a 10-0 run, and led the rest of the game. Trailing by 17 at the half, Eastern took a run at the Cougars as the second half started and put on a tight press defense to cut their deficit to six points. SIUE never faltered, stretching the lead back to eleven and mostly maintaining that margin. Ray'Sean Taylor led four players in double figures with 25 points, with 18 in the first half including a three point buzzer beater. Damarco Minor had his fourth straight and 11th double-double of the season with 16 points and a career high 14 rebounds. Both of the Wright twins were in double figures with Shamar scoring 14 and Lamar 11.

In the OVC Tournament quarterfinals, SIUE met third seeded conference co-champion Morehead State. The Cougars got off to a slow start, missing their first four shots and sank only two of their first 11 tries from the field. The Eagles hit only four of their first dozen shots, but they picked up the pace for a thirteen point 34-21 halftime lead. SIUE played closer in the second half, but the Eagles took a fifteen point win 78-63, and Morehead State improved to 24-8 and advanced to the OVC semifinals where they met No. 2 seed and fellow regular-season co-champion UT Martin. Ray'Sean Taylor again led the Cougar's scoring with 19 points and moved into fifth place all-time in SIUE scoring with 1,314 points. Shamar Wright added 12 points and is alone in third place in Cougar scoring with 1,549 points, and he is the all-time leader in games played with 154. Lamar Wright is second in games played with 143 and has 978 career points.

== Roster ==
2023–24 SIU Edwardsville Cougars men's basketball team
Players
Coaches

Pos.	#	Name	Height	Weight	Year	Previous school	Hometown
G	0	Demarco Minor	6 ft 0 in (1.83 m)	180 lb (82 kg)	So	S. Suburban Coll./Thornton THS	Chicago, IL
F	1	Dorion Staples	6 ft 7 in (2.01 m)	195 lb (88 kg)	Sr	Triton College/Massaponax HS	Fredericksburg, VA
G	2	Desmond Polk	6 ft 4 in (1.93 m)	175 lb (79 kg)	RS Jr	Link Year Prep/La Lumiere School	Milwaukee, WI
G	3	Ray'Sean Taylor	6 ft 1 in (1.85 m)	175 lb (79 kg)	RS Jr	Collinsville HS	Collinsville, IL
G	6	Jordan Pickett	6 ft 3 in (1.91 m)	190 lb (86 kg)	Fr	Belleville East HS	Belleville, IL
G	8	Quani Rudd	6 ft 5 in (1.96 m)	180 lb (82 kg)	Jr	Mt. Vernon THS	Mount Vernon, IL
G	11	Brian Taylor II	6 ft 4 in (1.93 m)	175 lb (79 kg)	So	Milwaukee/De Smet HS	St. Louis, MO
G	12	Ethan Yancy	6 ft 4 in (1.93 m)	185 lb (84 kg)	Jr	NW Kansas Tech/Premier Academy	Houston, TX
F	21	Terrance Thompson	6 ft 8 in (2.03 m)	250 lb (113 kg)	Jr	Navarro College/La Crosse Central HS	LaCrosse, WI
C	23	Adeola Seun	6 ft 9 in (2.06 m)	250 lb (113 kg)	Jr	Longwood	Lagos, Nigeria
C	34	Arnas Sakenis	6 ft 11 in (2.11 m)	260 lb (118 kg)	So	Andrew HS	Tinley Park, IL
G	40	Eddiean Tirado	6 ft 4 in (1.93 m)	190 lb (86 kg)	Jr	Indian Hills CC/Calusa Prep	Miami, FL
G	42	Shamar Wright	6 ft 7 in (2.01 m)	200 lb (91 kg)	RS Sr	Link Year Prep/Murrieta Mesa HS	Memphis, TN
F	55	Lamar Wright	6 ft 7 in (2.01 m)	205 lb (93 kg)	RS Sr	Link Year Prep/Murrieta Mesa HS	Memphis, TN

Head coach

- Brian Barone (Marquette)

Assistant coach(es)

- Colin Schneider (Green Bay)
- Terrance McGee (Missouri State)
- Angres Thorpe (Saint Leo College)
- Darreon Reddick (Tennessee State)
- Mike Waldo (SIUE)
- Ryan Hellenthal (UIC)

Legend

- (C) Team captain
- (S) Suspended
- (I) Ineligible
- (W) Walk-on
- Injured
- Current redshirt

Roster
Last update: November 7, 2023

== Schedule and results ==
Source=

Date time, TV	Rank^{#}	Opponent^{#}	Result	Record	High points	High rebounds	High assists	Site (attendance) city, state
Exhibition
November 5, 2023*; 7:00 pm		East–West	W 105–57	–	15 – L. Wright	9 – Minor	6 – Minor	First Community Arena (513); Edwardsville, IL
Non-conference regular season
November 6, 2023*; 6:00 PPM CT, ESPN+		at Dayton	L 47–63	0–1	14 – R. Taylor	14 – Minor	5 – Thompson	UD Arena (13,407); Dayton, OH
November 9. 2023*; 7:30 pm, ESPN+		North Park	W 92–67	1–1	29 – S. Wright	7 – Minor	4 – Tied	First Community Arena (1,318); Edwardsville, IL
November 13, 2023*; 7:00, ESPN+		at Missouri	L 50–68	1–2	14 – Minor	10 – Minor	2 – Minor	Mizzou Arena (9,656); Columbia, MO
November 16, 2023*; 5:00 pm		vs. Denver; Jaguar Classic	W 77–74	2–2	24 – S. Wright	13 – Minor	3 – Minor	Mitchell Center (1,110); Mobile, AL
November 17, 2023*; 6:00 pm		vs. Nicholls; Jaguar Classic	W 60–51	3–2	15 – S. Wright	11 – Minor	3 – R. Taylor	Mitchell Center (1,001); Mobile, AL
November 19, 2023*; 12:00 pm, ESPN+		at South Alabama; Jaguar Classic	L 75–82	3–3	17 – S. Wright	9 – Minor	4 – Minor	Mitchell Center (1,507); Mobile, AL
November 25, 2023*; 1:00 pm, ESPN+		Detroit Mercy	W 81–67	4–3	19 – L. Wright	7 – Minor	6 – R. Taylor	First Community Arena (715); Edwardsville, IL
November 28, 2023*; 7:00 pm, ESPN+		Missouri Baptist	W 86–62	5–3	24 – S. Wright	10 – Minor	8 – R. Taylor	First Community Arena (743); Edwardsville, IL
December 1, 2023*; 6:00 pm, ESPN+		at Troy	L 60–83	5–4	14 – Minor	5 – Tied	2 – Thompson	Trojan Arena (2,105); Troy, AL
December 6, 2023*; 7:00 pm, ESPN+		Green Bay	W 78–69	6–4	23 – R. Taylor	9 – Thompson	3 – R. Taylor	First Community Arena (837); Edwardsville, IL
December 10, 2023*; 1:00 pm, ESPN+		at Ball State	L 71–83	6–5	21 – Minor	12 – Minor	3 – Tied	Worthen Arena (3,254); Muncie, IN
December 18, 2023*; 7:00 pm, ESPN+		Central Christian	W 99–56	7–5	16 – S. Wright	5 – Tied	5 – B. Taylor	First Community Arena (673); Edwardsville, IL
December 21, 2023*; 7:00 pm, ESPN+		at Bradley	L 64–75	7–6	20 – R. Taylor	7 – Thompson	2 – Thompson	Carver Arena (4,875); Peoria, IL
Ohio Valley Conference regular season
December 29, 2023; 7:30 pm, ESPN+		Eastern Illinois	W 67–58	8–6 (1–0)	15 – Minor	10 – Minor	4 – L. Wright	First Community Arena (1,627); Edwardsville, IL
December 31, 2023; 3:30 pm, ESPN+		Western Illinois	L 70–78	8–7 (1–1)	21 – S. Wright	7 – Minor	6 – Minor	First Community Arena (1,409); Edwardsville, IL
January 4, 2024; 7:00 pm, ESPN+		at Little Rock	L 80–88	8–8 (1–2)	19 – R. Taylor	9 – Thompson	5 – R. Taylor	Jack Stephens Center (1,011); Little Rock, AR
January 11, 2024; 7:00 pm, ESPN+		Southern Indiana	W 67–64	9–8 (2–2)	16 – Tied	9 – Minor	5 – Minor	First Community Arena (1,642); Edwardsville, IL
January 13, 2024; 11:00 am, ESPNU/ESPN+		Morehead State	W 61–48	10–8 (3–2)	24 – Minor	13 – Minor	2 – Tied	First Community Arena (1,629); Edwardsville, IL
January 18, 2024; 7:30 pm, ESPN+		at Lindenwood	W 78–59	11–8 (4–2)	17 – Minor	8 – L. Wright	4 – Minor	Robert F. Hyland Arena (1,856); St. Charles, MO
January 20, 2024; 3:45 pm, ESPN+		at Southeast Missouri State	L 47–52	11–9 (4–3)	21 – Minor	8 – L. Wright	1 – Tied	Show Me Center (2,142); Cape Girardeau, MO
January 27, 2024; 3:30 pm, ESPN+		Tennessee Tech	W 74–57	12–9 (5–3)	18 – Taylor	10 – Tied	6 – Taylor	First Community Arena (2,157); Edwardsville, IL
February 1, 2024; 7:30 pm, ESPN+		Little Rock	W 68–66	13–9 (6–3)	17 – Minor	7 – Minor	6 – Minor	First Community Arena (1,254); Edwardsville, IL
February 3, 2024; 7:30 pm, ESPN+		UT Martin	L 79–90	13–10 (6–4)	26 – S. Wright	7 – L. Wright	8 – Minor	First Community Arena (1,639); Edwardsville, IL
February 8, 2024; 6:00 pm, ESPN+		at Morehead State	L 68–79	13–11 (6–5)	22 – R. Taylor	13 – Minor	4 – Minor	Ellis Johnson Arena (3,245); Morehead, KY
February 10, 2024; 7:30, ESPN+		at Southern Indiana	L 67–84	13–12 (6–6)	11 – L. Wright	11 – Minor	2 – Tied	Screaming Eagles Arena (3,276); Evansville, IN
February 15, 2024; 7:30 pm, ESPN+		Lindenwood	W 91–63	14–12 (7–6)	20 – L. Wright	10 – L. Wright	7 – Minor	First Community Arena (2.036); Edwardsville, IL
February 17, 2024; 3:30 pm, ESPN+		Southeast Missouri	W 80–76	15–12 (8–6)	26 – Minor	8 – Minor	4 – S. Wright	First Community Arena (2,233); Edwardsville, IL
February 22, 2024; 7:30, ESPN+		at Tennessee Tech	W 78–77	16–12 (9–6)	21 – R. Taylor	8 – L. Wright	5 – Minor	Eblen Center (1,011); Cookeville, TN
February 24, 2024; 3:30 pm, ESPN+		at Tennessee State	L 71–75	16–13 (9–7)	31 – Minor	12 – Minor	3 – R. Taylor	Gentry Complex (1,037); Nashville, TN
February 27, 2024; 7:30 pm, ESPN+		at Eastern Illinois	L 79–84	16–14 (9–8)	24 – Minor	11 – Minor	4 – R. Taylor	Groniger Arena (1,628); Charleston, IL
March 2, 2024; 3:30 pm, ESPN+		at Western Illinois	L 65–76	16–15 (9–9)	20 – Minor	11 – Minor	7 – R. Taylor	Western Hall (1,116); Macomb, IL
OVC Tournament
March 6, 2024; 9:00 pm, ESPN+	(6)	vs. (7) Eastern Illinois; First round	W 68–57	17–15	25 – R. Taylor	14 – Minor	2 – Tied	Ford Center (1,180); Evansville, IN
March 8, 2024; 9:00 pm, ESPN+	(6)	vs. (3) Morehead State; Quarterfinals	L 63 –78	17–16	19 – R. Taylor	6 – Minor, Thompson	2 – Minor, R. Taylor	Ford Center (1,140); Evansville, IN
*Non-conference game. ^{#}Rankings from AP Poll. (#) Tournament seedings in parentheses. All times are in Central Time; Source.
