= Preston Spradlin =

American college basketball coach

Current position
- Title: Head coach
- Team: James Madison
- Conference: Sun Belt
- Record: 38–27 (.585)

Biographical details
- Born: December 30, 1986 (age 39); Pikeville, Kentucky, U.S.

Playing career
- 2005–2009: Alice Lloyd College

Coaching career (HC unless noted)
- 2009–2011: Kentucky (GA)
- 2014–2016: Morehead State (asst.)
- 2016–2024: Morehead State
- 2024–present: James Madison

Administrative career (AD unless noted)
- 2011–2014: Kentucky (dir. of ops.)

Head coaching record
- Overall: 178–136 (.567)
- Tournaments: 0–2 (NCAA Division I); 1–1 (NIT)

Accomplishments and honors

Championships
- 2 OVC tournament (2021, 2024); 2 OVC regular season (2023, 2024); Sun Belt regular season (2025)

Awards
- 2× OVC Coach of the Year (2021, 2023)

Preston Spradlin is an American college basketball coach who is currently the head coach at James Madison University. He previously served as the head coach at Morehead State University.

== Coaching career ==
After a playing career at NAIA Alice Lloyd College, Spradlin joined John Calipari's staff at Kentucky as a graduate assistant from 2009 to 2011, and assistant director of basketball operations from 2011 to 2014. He also aided Calipari with the Dominican Republic national basketball team in 2011 and 2012.

Spradlin joined Sean Woods's staff at Morehead State in 2014 as an assistant coach, and was elevated to interim head coach when Woods resigned amid player allegations that he had assaulted them. After going 12–9 in the interim role, and guiding the Eagles to a 10–6 conference record in Ohio Valley Conference play in the East Division, Spradlin was given the job on a permanent basis.

== Personal life ==
Spradlin is a Christian. He is married to the former Misty Tackett. They have one son and one daughter.

== Head coaching record ==
=== NCAA DI ===
Record table
Season	Team	Overall	Conference	Standing	Postseason
Morehead State Eagles (Ohio Valley Conference) (2016–2024)
2016–17	Morehead State	12–9^{‡}	10–6	2nd (East)	
2017–18	Morehead State	8–21	4–14	12th	
2018–19	Morehead State	13–20	8–10	5th	
2019–20	Morehead State	13–19	7–11	8th	
2020–21	Morehead State	23–8	17–3	2nd	NCAA Division I Round of 64
2021–22	Morehead State	23–11	13–5	3rd	
2022–23	Morehead State	22–12	14–4	1st	NIT Second Round
2023–24	Morehead State	26–9	14–4	T–1st	NCAA Division I Round of 64
Morehead State:		140–109 (.562)	87–57 (.604)	‡ Woods resigned 12/15/16; Spradlin coached rest of season.	
James Madison Dukes (Sun Belt Conference) (2024–present)
2024–25	James Madison	20–12	13–5	T–1st	
2025–26	James Madison	18–15	9–9	T–8th	
James Madison:		38–27 (.585)	22–14 (.611)		
Total:		178–136 (.567)			
National champion Postseason invitational champion Conference regular season champion Conference regular season and conference tournament champion Division regular season champion Division regular season and conference tournament champion Conference tournament champion
