= 2023–24 Southern Indiana Screaming Eagles men's basketball team =

American college basketball season

2023–24 Southern Indiana Screaming Eagles men's basketball
- Conference: Ohio Valley Conference
- Record: 8–24 (5–13 OVC)
- Head coach: Stan Gouard (4th season)
- Assistant coaches: John Spruance; Jon Aldridge; Chris Moore; Doug Novsek
- Home arena: Screaming Eagles Arena

2023–24 Ohio Valley Conference men's basketball standings
	Conf.				Overall
Team	W		L	PCT	W		L	PCT
Little Rock	14	–	4	.778	21	–	13	.618
UT Martin	14	–	4	.778	21	–	11	.656
Morehead State †	14	–	4	.778	26	–	9	.743
Western Illinois	13	–	5	.722	21	–	12	.636
Tennessee State	10	–	8	.556	18	–	15	.545
SIU Edwardsville	9	–	9	.500	17	–	16	.515
Eastern Illinois	8	–	10	.444	14	–	18	.438
Southern Indiana*	5	–	13	.278	8	–	24	.250
Tennessee Tech	5	–	13	.278	10	–	21	.323
Southeast Missouri State	4	–	14	.222	9	–	22	.290
Lindenwood*	3	–	15	.167	9	–	22	.290
† 2024 OVC tournament winner * ineligible for the 2024 NCAA tournament due to transition period

The 2023–24 Southern Indiana Screaming Eagles men's basketball team represented the University of Southern Indiana during the 2023–24 NCAA Division I men's basketball season. The Screaming Eagles, led by fourth-year head coach Stan Gouard, played their home games at Screaming Eagles Arena in Evansville, Indiana as members of the Ohio Valley Conference (OVC).

This season marked Southern Indiana's second year of a four-year transition period from Division II to Division I. As a result, the Screaming Eagles were not eligible for the NCAA tournament until the 2026–27 season.

== Previous season ==
The Screaming Eagles finished the 2022–23 season 16–17, 9–9 in OVC play, to finish tied for sixth place. They were defeated by SIU Edwardsville in the first round of the OVC tournament. They received an invitation to the CBI, where they would lose to San Jose State in the first round.

== Roster ==
2023–24 Southern Indiana Screaming Eagles men's basketball team
Players
Coaches

Pos.	#	Name	Height	Weight	Year	Previous school	Hometown
G	0	Ryan Hall	6 ft 5 in (1.96 m)	190 lb (86 kg)	So	Iowa Lakes CC	Kettering, OH
G/F	1	Javius Moore	6 ft 6 in (1.98 m)	190 lb (86 kg)	Jr	SW Mississippi CC	McComb, MS
G	2	Xavier McCord	6 ft 5 in (1.96 m)	200 lb (91 kg)	Jr	Laramie CC	Cheyenne, WY
G	3	Jordan Tillmon	6 ft 2 in (1.88 m)	180 lb (82 kg)	Jr	Florida A&M	Pine Bluff, AR
F/C	4	Nolan Causwell	6 ft 11 in (2.11 m)	235 lb (107 kg)	Sr	Tennessee Tech	Duluth, GA
G	5	Jack Campion	5 ft 11 in (1.8 m)	170 lb (77 kg)	So	Milton HS	Milton, WI
F	10	Jack Mielke	6 ft 7 in (2.01 m)	220 lb (100 kg)	Jr	Downers Grove North HS	Downers Grove, IL
G	11	Luther Jr. Smith	6 ft 1 in (1.85 m)	180 lb (82 kg)	Fr	Sussex Hamilton HS	Milwaukee, WI
G	13	Sam Mervis	5 ft 11 in (1.8 m)	175 lb (79 kg)	Jr	Indiana State	Indianapolis, IN
G	20	Johnny Semany	6 ft 0 in (1.83 m)	160 lb (73 kg)	So	Lawrence	Danville, CA
G/F	21	AJ Smith	6 ft 6 in (1.98 m)	215 lb (98 kg)	So	Metro-East Lutheran HS	Edwardsville, IL
G	33	Jeremiah Hernandez	6 ft 4 in (1.93 m)	180 lb (82 kg)	Jr	Kent State	Chicago, IL
F	35	Yarin Hasson	6 ft 10 in (2.08 m)	200 lb (91 kg)	So	UConn	Gan Yavne, Israel
F	50	Nick Hittle	6 ft 10 in (2.08 m)	245 lb (111 kg)	Jr	Indiana State	Indianapolis, IN
C	52	Kiyron Powell	6 ft 8 in (2.03 m)	210 lb (95 kg)	So	Houston	Evansville, IN

Head coach

- Stan Gouard (Southern Indiana)

Assistant coach(es)

- John Spruance (Hope)
- Jon Aldridge (Indianapolis)
- Chris Moore (Kentucky State)
- Doug Novsek (Southern Illinois)

Legend

- (C) Team captain
- (S) Suspended
- (I) Ineligible
- (W) Walk-on
- Injured
- Current redshirt

Roster
Last update: November 30, 2023

== Schedule and results ==
Date time, TV	Rank^{#}	Opponent^{#}	Result	Record	Site (attendance) city, state
Non-conference regular season
November 6, 2023*; 7:00 p.m., BSMW		at Saint Louis	L 63–75	0–1	Chaifetz Arena (4,989); St. Louis, MO
November 9, 2023*; 6:00 p.m., B1G		at No. 4 Michigan State	L 51–74	0–2	Breslin Center (14,797); East Lansing, MI
November 12, 2023*; 3:30 p.m., ESPN+		Chicago State	L 67–78	0–3	Screaming Eagles Arena (1,959); Evansville, IN
November 14, 2023*; 7:00 p.m., ESPN+		Tiffin	W 68–65	1–3	Screaming Eagles Arena (1,370); Evansville, IN
November 18, 2023*; 1:00 p.m., ESPN+		at La Salle; Duke Blue Devil Challenge	L 78–79	1–4	Tom Gola Arena (1,254); Philadelphia, PA
November 20, 2023*; 6:00 p.m., ESPN+		at Bucknell; Duke Blue Devil Challenge	L 56–67	1–5	Sojka Pavilion (692); Lewisburg, PA
November 24, 2023*; 5:00 p.m., ACCN		at No. 9 Duke; Duke Blue Devil Challenge	L 62–80	1–6	Cameron Indoor Stadium (9,314); Durham, NC
November 28, 2023*; 7:00 p.m., ESPN+		East–West	W 107–49	2–6	Screaming Eagles Arena (1,145); Evansville, IN
December 2, 2023*; 3:00 p.m., ESPN+		Bowling Green	L 52–54	2–7	Screaming Eagles Arena (1,539); Evansville, IN
December 6, 2023*; 7:00 p.m., ESPN+		Purdue Fort Wayne	L 57–70	2–8	Screaming Eagles Arena (1,455); Evansville, IN
December 9, 2023*; 1:00 p.m., ESPN+		at Indiana State	L 54–98	2–9	Hulman Center (4,369); Terre Haute, IN
December 19, 2023*; 7:00 p.m., ESPN+		St. Francis (IL)	W 79–47	3–9	Screaming Eagles Arena (1,469); Evansville, IN
December 22, 2023*; 7:00 p.m., ESPN+		at Southern Illinois	L 50–81	3–10	Banterra Center (6,024); Carbondale, IL
OVC regular season
December 29, 2023; 7:30 p.m., ESPN+		at Southeast Missouri State	L 91–93 ^{OT}	3–11 (0–1)	Show Me Center (1,470); Cape Girardeau, MO
December 31, 2023; 2:30 p.m., ESPN+		at Lindenwood	W 73–62	4–11 (1–1)	Hyland Performance Arena (2,158); St. Charles, MO
January 4, 2024; 7:30 p.m., ESPN+		Tennessee State	W 69–67	5–11 (2–1)	Screaming Eagles Arena (1,258); Evansville, IN
January 6, 2024; 7:30 p.m., ESPN+		Tennessee Tech	L 59–73	5–12 (2–2)	Screaming Eagles Arena (2,460); Evansville, IN
January 11, 2024; 7:00 p.m., ESPN+		at SIU Edwardsville	L 64–67	5–13 (2–3)	First Community Arena (1,642); Edwardsville, IL
January 18, 2024; 7:30 p.m., ESPN+		Little Rock	L 75–77	5–14 (2–4)	Screaming Eagles Arena (1,247); Evansville, IN
January 20, 2024; 3:30 p.m., ESPN+		Morehead State	L 70–81	5–15 (2–5)	Screaming Eagles Arena (2,512); Evansville, IN
January 25, 2024; 8:00 p.m., ESPNU/ESPN+		Western Illinois	L 68–73	5–16 (2–6)	Screaming Eagles Arena (2,726); Evansville, IN
February 1, 2024; 7:30 p.m., ESPN+		at Tennessee Tech	W 74–71	6–16 (3–6)	Eblen Center (1,712); Cookeville, TN
February 3, 2024; 3:30 p.m., ESPN+		at Tennessee State	L 74–79	6–17 (3–7)	Gentry Complex (784); Nashville, TN
February 8, 2024; 7:30 p.m., ESPN+		Eastern Illinois	L 71–81	6–18 (3–8)	Screaming Eagles Arena (1,877); Evansville, IN
February 10, 2024; 7:30 p.m., ESPN+		SIU Edwardsville	W 84–67	7–18 (4–8)	Screaming Eagles Arena (3,276); Evansville, IN
February 15, 2024; 7:30 p.m., ESPN+		at UT Martin	L 68–77	7–19 (4–9)	Skyhawk Arena (911); Martin, TN
February 17, 2024; 3:00 p.m., ESPN+		at Little Rock	L 62–80	7–20 (4–10)	Jack Stephens Center (1,875); Little Rock, AR
February 20, 2024; 6:00 p.m., ESPN+		at Morehead State	W 80–73	8–20 (5–10)	Ellis Johnson Arena (1,455); Morehead, KY
February 24, 2024; 3:30 p.m., ESPN+		at Western Illinois	L 76–82	8–21 (5–11)	Western Hall (1,173); Macomb, IL
February 29, 2024; 7:30 p.m., ESPN+		Lindenwood	L 63–67	8–22 (5–12)	Screaming Eagles Arena (1,418); Evansville, IN
March 2, 2024; 7:30 p.m., ESPN+		Southeast Missouri State	L 66–70	8–23 (5–13)	Screaming Eagles Arena (1,871); Evansville, IN
OVC tournament
March 6, 2024; 6:30 p.m., ESPN+	(8)	vs. (5) Tennessee State; First round	L 64–78	8–24	Ford Center; Evansville, IN
*Non-conference game. ^{#}Rankings from AP poll. (#) Tournament seedings in parentheses. All times are in Central.
