= 2023–24 Western Illinois Leathernecks men's basketball team =

American college basketball season

2023–24 Western Illinois Leathernecks men's basketball
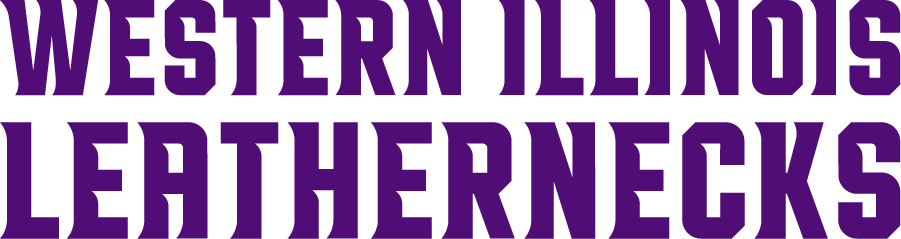
- Conference: Ohio Valley Conference
- Record: 21–12 (13–5 OVC)
- Head coach: Chad Boudreau (1st season)
- Associate head coach: Kyle Heikkinen
- Assistant coaches: Chris Hill; John Clancy; Kamrein Street; Kris Glover
- Home arena: Western Hall

2023–24 Ohio Valley Conference men's basketball standings
	Conf.				Overall
Team	W		L	PCT	W		L	PCT
Little Rock	14	–	4	.778	21	–	13	.618
UT Martin	14	–	4	.778	21	–	11	.656
Morehead State †	14	–	4	.778	26	–	9	.743
Western Illinois	13	–	5	.722	21	–	12	.636
Tennessee State	10	–	8	.556	18	–	15	.545
SIU Edwardsville	9	–	9	.500	17	–	16	.515
Eastern Illinois	8	–	10	.444	14	–	18	.438
Southern Indiana*	5	–	13	.278	8	–	24	.250
Tennessee Tech	5	–	13	.278	10	–	21	.323
Southeast Missouri State	4	–	14	.222	9	–	22	.290
Lindenwood*	3	–	15	.167	9	–	22	.290
† 2024 OVC tournament winner * ineligible for the 2024 NCAA tournament due to transition period

The 2023–24 Western Illinois Leathernecks men's basketball team represented Western Illinois University during the 2023–24 NCAA Division I men's basketball season. The Leathernecks, led by first-year head coach Chad Boudreau, played their home games at Western Hall in Macomb, Illinois as first-year members of the Ohio Valley Conference (OVC).

The Leathernecks finished the season 21–12, 13–5 in OVC play, to finish in fourth place. They defeated Tennessee State before falling to Little Rock in the semifinals of the OVC tournament.

== Previous season ==
The Leathernecks finished the 2022–23 season 16–14, 9–9 in Summit League play, to finish in a tie for fourth place. They were defeated by St. Thomas in the quarterfinals of the Summit League tournament. This was the Leathernecks' final season as a member of the Summit League, as they moved to the Ohio Valley Conference for the 2023–24 season.

On April 7, 2023, it was announced that head coach Rob Jeter would be leaving the school to take the head coaching position at Southern Utah. After being named interim head coach immediately following Jeter's departure, Chad Boudreau was named the team's permanent head coach on April 13.

== Roster ==
2023–24 Western Illinois Leathernecks men's basketball team
Players
Coaches

Pos.	#	Name	Height	Weight	Year	Previous school	Hometown
G	0	Shay Davis	6 ft 0 in (1.83 m)	170 lb (77 kg)	Jr	Ranger College	Orlando, FL
G	1	Quinlan Bennett	6 ft 4 in (1.93 m)	195 lb (88 kg)	RS Sr	Lamar	Chicago, IL
G	2	Ryan Myers	6 ft 1 in (1.85 m)	180 lb (82 kg)	Jr	Indian Hills CC	Brooklyn, NY
G	3	KJ Lee	6 ft 8 in (2.03 m)	210 lb (95 kg)	Jr	Fort Zumwalt North HS	O'Fallon, MO
F	4	Jesiah West	6 ft 5 in (1.96 m)	205 lb (93 kg)	Sr	Southeastern CC	Elizabeth, NJ
G	5	James Jr. Dent	6 ft 5 in (1.96 m)	160 lb (73 kg)	Jr	John A. Logan College	Springfield, IL
G	10	JJ Kalakon	6 ft 5 in (1.96 m)	195 lb (88 kg)	Sr	Triton College	Louisville, KY
G	11	De' Meiko Anderson	6 ft 0 in (1.83 m)	160 lb (73 kg)	RS Fr	Minneapolis North HS	Minneapolis, MN
G	13	Braden Lamar	6 ft 5 in (1.96 m)	215 lb (98 kg)	RS So	Bishop Gorman HS	Las Vegas, NV
G	15	Dirin Birhiray	6 ft 5 in (1.96 m)	190 lb (86 kg)	RS Fr	Brebeuf Jesuit Prep	Indianapolis, IN
F	20	Rodrick Payne	6 ft 8 in (2.03 m)	230 lb (104 kg)	Jr	Wisconsin–River Falls	Cottage Grove, MN
F	21	Jacksun Hamilton	6 ft 7 in (2.01 m)	195 lb (88 kg)	RS Jr	Parkside	La Crosse, WI
C	22	Joe Petrakis	6 ft 11 in (2.11 m)	220 lb (100 kg)	RS Sr	Illinois State	Wichita, KS
C	23	Drew Cisse	6 ft 11 in (2.11 m)	230 lb (104 kg)	Sr	UMSL	San Diego, CA
F	24	Tay Knox	6 ft 9 in (2.06 m)	210 lb (95 kg)	So	Chipola College	Troy, AL

Head coach

- Chad Boudreau (Hannibal–LaGrange)

Assistant coach(es)

- Kyle Heikkinen (UW–Whitewater)
- Chris Hill (Milwaukee)
- John Clancy (Concordia–Chicago)
- Kamrein Street (Western Illinois)
- Kris Glover (Missouri)

Legend

- (C) Team captain
- (S) Suspended
- (I) Ineligible
- (W) Walk-on
- Injured
- Current redshirt

Roster
Last update: November 11, 2023

== Schedule and results ==
Date time, TV	Rank^{#}	Opponent^{#}	Result	Record	Site (attendance) city, state
Non-conference regular season
November 6, 2023*; 7:00 p.m., ESPN+		at UTSA	L 68–78	0–1	Convocation Center (1,567); San Antonio, TX
November 8, 2023*; 6:00 p.m., ESPN+		at SMU	L 53–90	0–2	Moody Coliseum (4,003); University Park, TX
November 12, 2023*; 3:30 p.m., ESPN+		St. Ambrose	W 94–59	1–2	Western Hall (609); Macomb, IL
November 17, 2023*; 7:00 p.m., ESPN+		Southern	W 88–80 ^{OT}	2–2	Western Hall (667); Macomb, IL
November 21, 2023*; 7:00 p.m., ESPN+		at Valparaiso	L 66–73	2–3	Athletics–Recreation Center (1,257); Valparaiso, IN
November 24, 2023*; 8:00 p.m., B1G		at Illinois	L 52–84	2–4	State Farm Center (13,051); Champaign, IL
November 27, 2023*; 6:00 p.m., B1G		at Wisconsin	L 49–71	2–5	Kohl Center (14,092); Madison, WI
November 30, 2023*; 7:00 p.m., ESPN+		Hannibal–LaGrange	W 92–40	3–5	Western Hall (597); Macomb, IL
December 3, 2023*; 1:00 p.m., ESPN+		South Dakota	L 68–70	3–6	Western Hall (693); Macomb, IL
December 6, 2023*; 7:00 p.m., ESPN+		Coe	W 80–58	4–6	Western Hall (680); Macomb, IL
December 9, 2023*; 6:00 p.m., ESPN+		at Green Bay	W 68–59	5–6	Resch Center (1,732); Ashwaubenon, WI
December 18, 2023*; 7:00 p.m., ESPN+		Eureka	W 92–56	6–6	Western Hall (567); Macomb, IL
December 20, 2023*; 12:00 p.m., ESPN+		at Central Arkansas	W 65–54	7–6	Farris Center (745); Conway, AR
Ohio Valley Conference regular season
December 31, 2023; 3:30 p.m., ESPN+		at SIU Edwardsville	W 78–70	8–6 (1–0)	First Community Arena (1,409); Edwardsville, IL
January 4, 2024; 7:30 p.m., ESPN+		Southeast Missouri State	W 68–61	9–6 (2–0)	Western Hall (629); Macomb, IL
January 6, 2024; 3:30 p.m., ESPN+		Lindenwood	W 68–57	10–6 (3–0)	Western Hall (601); Macomb, IL
January 11, 2024; 7:30 p.m., ESPN+		at UT Martin	W 73–64	11–6 (4–0)	Skyhawk Arena (1,598); Martin, TN
January 13, 2024; 3:30 p.m., ESPN+		at Eastern Illinois	W 63–60	12–6 (5–0)	Groniger Arena (1,338); Charleston, IL
January 20, 2024; 3:30 p.m., ESPN+		Tennessee State	L 57–58	12–7 (5–1)	Western Hall (1,046); Macomb, IL
January 25, 2024; 7:30 p.m., ESPN+		at Southern Indiana	W 73–68	13–7 (6–1)	Screaming Eagles Arena (2,726); Evansville, IN
January 27, 2024; 2:00 p.m., ESPN+		at Morehead State	L 50–64	13–8 (6–2)	Ellis Johnson Arena (2,988); Morehead, KY
February 1, 2024; 7:30 p.m., ESPN+		at Lindenwood	W 79–71	14–8 (7–2)	Hyland Performance Arena (1,069); St. Charles, MO
February 3, 2024; 3:45 p.m., ESPN+		at Southeast Missouri State	W 76–55	15–8 (8–2)	Show Me Center (1,060); Cape Girardeau, MO
February 8, 2024; 7:30 p.m., ESPN+		Little Rock	L 60–63	15–9 (8–3)	Western Hall (1,076); Macomb, IL
February 10, 2024; 3:30 p.m., ESPN+		UT Martin	L 59–62	15–10 (8–4)	Western Hall (1,448); Macomb, IL
February 15, 2024; 7:30 p.m., ESPN+		at Tennessee Tech	W 62–55	16–10 (9–4)	Eblen Center (998); Cookeville, TN
February 17, 2024; 3:30 p.m., ESPN+		at Tennessee State	W 68–61	17–10 (10–4)	Gentry Complex (1,479); Nashville, TN
February 22, 2024; 7:30 p.m., ESPN+		Morehead State	L 57–78	17–11 (10–5)	Western Hall (1,173); Macomb, IL
February 24, 2024; 3:30 p.m., ESPN+		Southern Indiana	W 82–76	18–11 (11–5)	Western Hall (1,173); Macomb, IL
February 29, 2024; 7:30 p.m., ESPN+		Eastern Illinois	W 70–66	19–11 (12–5)	Western Hall (1,047); Macomb, IL
March 2, 2024; 3:30 p.m., ESPN+		SIU Edwardsville	W 76–65	20–11 (13–5)	Western Hall (1,116); Macomb, IL
Ohio Valley Conference tournament
March 7, 2024; 6:30 p.m., ESPN+	(4)	vs. (5) Tennessee State; Quarterfinals	W 61–59	21–11	Ford Center; Evansville, IN
March 8, 2024; 7:00 p.m., ESPNU	(4)	vs. (1) Little Rock; Semifinals	L 57–82	21–12	Ford Center; Evansville, IN
*Non-conference game. ^{#}Rankings from AP poll. (#) Tournament seedings in parentheses. All times are in Central.
