= 2024 Ohio Valley Conference men's basketball tournament =

- Classification: Division I
- Season: 2023–24
- Teams: 8
- Site: Ford Center; Evansville, Indiana
- Champions: Morehead State (6th title)
- Winning coach: Preston Spradlin (2nd title)
- MVP: Riley Minix (Morehead State)
- Attendance: 5,018 (total); 1,421 (championship)
- Television: ESPN+, ESPNU, ESPN2, Westwood One (Radio)

2023–24 Ohio Valley Conference men's basketball standings
	Conf.				Overall
Team	W		L	PCT	W		L	PCT
Little Rock	14	–	4	.778	21	–	13	.618
UT Martin	14	–	4	.778	21	–	11	.656
Morehead State †	14	–	4	.778	26	–	9	.743
Western Illinois	13	–	5	.722	21	–	12	.636
Tennessee State	10	–	8	.556	18	–	15	.545
SIU Edwardsville	9	–	9	.500	17	–	16	.515
Eastern Illinois	8	–	10	.444	14	–	18	.438
Southern Indiana*	5	–	13	.278	8	–	24	.250
Tennessee Tech	5	–	13	.278	10	–	21	.323
Southeast Missouri State	4	–	14	.222	9	–	22	.290
Lindenwood*	3	–	15	.167	9	–	22	.290
* ineligible for the 2024 NCAA tournament due to transition period
† 2024 OVC tournament winner

The 2024 Ohio Valley Conference Men's Basketball Tournament was the final event of the 2023–24 NCAA Division I men's basketball season in the Ohio Valley Conference. The tournament was held March 6–9, 2024 at the Ford Center in Evansville, Indiana. The tournament winner, Morehead State, received the conference's automatic bid to the 2024 NCAA Division I men's basketball tournament.

== Seeds ==
Only the top eight teams in the conference qualified for the tournament. Teams were seeded by record within the conference, with a tiebreaker system to seed teams with identical conference records.

If a team that is not eligible for the NCAA Tournament wins the Ohio Valley Conference Tournament, the conference's automatic bid goes to the tournament runner-up. If that team is also not eligible, i.e. two ineligible teams met in the tournament final, the automatic bid goes to the highest seeded tournament-eligible semifinal loser.

Seed	School	Conference	Tiebreaker
1	Little Rock	14–4	2–1 vs. UT Martin/Morehead State
2	UT Martin	14–4	2–2 vs. Little Rock/Morehead State
3	Morehead State	14–4	1–2 vs. UT Martin/Little Rock
4	Western Illinois	13–5	
5	Tennessee State	10–8	
6	SIU Edwardsville	9–9	
7	Eastern Illinois	8–10	
8	Southern Indiana	5–13	1–1 vs. Morehead State
DNQ	Tennessee Tech	5–13	0–2 vs. Morehead State
DNQ	Southeast Missouri State	4–14	
DNQ	Lindenwood	3–15	

== Schedule ==
Game	Time	Matchup	Score	Television	Attendance
First Round – Wednesday, March 6
1	6:30 pm	No. 5 Tennessee State vs. No. 8 Southern Indiana	78–64	ESPN+	1,180
2	9:00 pm	No. 6 SIU Edwardsville vs. No. 7 Eastern Illinois	68–57	ESPN+	1,180
Quarterfinals – Thursday, March 7
3	6:30 pm	No. 4 Western Illinois vs. No. 5 Tennessee State	61–59	ESPN+	1,140
4	9:00 pm	No. 3 Morehead State vs. No. 6 SIU Edwardsville	78-63	ESPN+	1,140
Semifinals – Friday, March 8
5	7:00 pm	No. 1 Little Rock vs. No. 4 Western Illinois	82–57	ESPNU	1,277
6	9:30 pm	No. 2 UT Martin vs. No. 3 Morehead State	78–84	ESPNU	1,277
Championship – Saturday, March 9
7	7:00 pm	No. 1 Little Rock vs. No. 3 Morehead State	55–69	ESPN2	1,421
All game times in Central Time.

== Bracket ==
First Round; Wednesday, March 6
5	Tennessee State	78
8	Southern Indiana	64
6	SIU Edwardsville	68
7	Eastern Illinois	57

Quarterfinals; Thursday, March 7
4	Western Illinois	61
5	Tennessee State	59
3	Morehead State	78
6	SIU Edwardsville	63

Semifinals; Friday, March 8
1	Little Rock	82
4	Western Illinois	57
2	UT Martin	78
3	Morehead State	84

Championship; Saturday, March 9
1	Little Rock	55
3	Morehead State	69
