= 2023–24 Eastern Illinois Panthers men's basketball team =

American college basketball season

2023–24 Eastern Illinois Panthers men's basketball
- Conference: Ohio Valley Conference
- Record: 14–18 (8–10 OVC)
- Head coach: Marty Simmons (3rd season)
- Assistant coaches: Marlon London; Kylen Butler; Rich McBride; Bob Lockart; Jalen Hutton
- Home arena: Groniger Arena

2023–24 Ohio Valley Conference men's basketball standings
| | Conf. | | | | Overall |
| Team | W | | L | PCT | W | | L | PCT |
|---|---|---|---|---|---|---|---|---|
| Little Rock | 14 | – | 4 | .778 | 21 | – | 13 | .618 |
| UT Martin | 14 | – | 4 | .778 | 21 | – | 11 | .656 |
| Morehead State † | 14 | – | 4 | .778 | 26 | – | 9 | .743 |
| Western Illinois | 13 | – | 5 | .722 | 21 | – | 12 | .636 |
| Tennessee State | 10 | – | 8 | .556 | 18 | – | 15 | .545 |
| SIU Edwardsville | 9 | – | 9 | .500 | 17 | – | 16 | .515 |
| Eastern Illinois | 8 | – | 10 | .444 | 14 | – | 18 | .438 |
| Southern Indiana* | 5 | – | 13 | .278 | 8 | – | 24 | .250 |
| Tennessee Tech | 5 | – | 13 | .278 | 10 | – | 21 | .323 |
| Southeast Missouri State | 4 | – | 14 | .222 | 9 | – | 22 | .290 |
| Lindenwood* | 3 | – | 15 | .167 | 9 | – | 22 | .290 |
† 2024 OVC tournament winner * ineligible for the 2024 NCAA tournament due to transition period

The 2023–24 Eastern Illinois Panthers men's basketball team represented Eastern Illinois University during the 2023–24 NCAA Division I men's basketball season. The Panthers, led by third-year head coach Marty Simmons, played their home games at the newly renamed Groniger Arena (Note: On November 25, it was announced that the arena, known as Lantz Arena, would be renamed to Groniger Arena, "following a seven-figure gift by long-time benefactor Jerry Groniger".) in Charleston, Illinois as members of the Ohio Valley Conference (OVC).

== Previous season ==
The Panthers finished the 2022–23 9–22, 5–13 in OVC play, to finish in last place. They failed to qualify for the OVC tournament.

== Roster ==
2023–24 Eastern Illinois Panthers men's basketball team
Players
Coaches

| Pos. | # | Name | Height | Weight | Year | Previous school | Hometown |
|---|---|---|---|---|---|---|---|
| G | 1 | Corey Jr. Sawyer | 6 ft 4 in (1.93 m) | 160 lb (73 kg) | Jr | Cloud County Community College | Orlando, FL |
| G | 3 | Nakyel Shelton | 6 ft 3 in (1.91 m) | 180 lb (82 kg) | Jr | South Suburban College | Chicago, IL |
| G | 4 | Isaiah Griffin | 6 ft 0 in (1.83 m) | 180 lb (82 kg) | Fr | Sunrise Christian Academy | Orange, NJ |
| F | 5 | Sincere Malone | 6 ft 8 in (2.03 m) | 210 lb (95 kg) | So | We Are United Prep | Chicago, IL |
| G/F | 10 | Kyndall Davis | 6 ft 5 in (1.96 m) | 200 lb (91 kg) | Jr | Panola College | Chicago, IL |
| G | 11 | Jordan "Tiger" Booker | 5 ft 10 in (1.78 m) | 190 lb (86 kg) | Sr | Tarleton State | Chicago, IL |
| G | 12 | Carson Prost | 6 ft 3 in (1.91 m) | 185 lb (84 kg) | Jr | Rend Lake College | Mount Vernon, IL |
| F | 17 | Lazar Grbovic | 6 ft 8 in (2.03 m) | 240 lb (109 kg) | RS So | Moberly Area Community College | Belgrade, Serbia |
| G | 20 | Caleb Donaldson | 6 ft 5 in (1.96 m) | 200 lb (91 kg) | Sr | St. Cloud State | Rockton, IL |
| F | 22 | Luke Light | 6 ft 8 in (2.03 m) | 205 lb (93 kg) | So | Paradise Honors High School | Surprise, AZ |
| F | 23 | Rodolfo Bolis | 6 ft 8 in (2.03 m) | 230 lb (104 kg) | Jr | NBA Academy Latin America | Espírito Santo, Brazil |
| G | 24 | Jaylin Gibson | 6 ft 4 in (1.93 m) | 205 lb (93 kg) | Jr | Mount St. Mary's | Evanston, IL |
| G | 25 | Dan Luers | 6 ft 5 in (1.96 m) | 210 lb (95 kg) | Jr | Defiance College | Lebanon, OH |
| F | 34 | Jermaine Hamlin | 6 ft 10 in (2.08 m) | 235 lb (107 kg) | Sr | Illinois | Lincoln, IL |
| F | 40 | Kooper Jacobi | 6 ft 7 in (2.01 m) | 200 lb (91 kg) | RS So | Toledo | Sellersburg, IN |

Head coach

- Marty Simmons (Evansville)

Assistant coach(es)

- Marlon London (DePaul)
- Kylen Butler (Indianapolis)
- Rich McBride (Illinois)
- Bob Lockart (Millikin)
- Jalen Hutton (Culver–Stockton)

Legend

- (C) Team captain
- (S) Suspended
- (I) Ineligible
- (W) Walk-on
- Injured
- Current redshirt

Roster
Last update: November 28, 2023

== Schedule and results ==
| Date time, TV | Rank^{#} | Opponent^{#} | Result | Record | Site (attendance) city, state |
Non-conference regular season
| November 6, 2023*; 7:00 p.m., B1G+ | | at No. 25 Illinois | L 52–80 | 0–1 | State Farm Center (15,014); Champaign, IL |
| November 8, 2023*; 7:00 p.m., ESPN+ | | Monmouth (IL) | W 91–45 | 1–1 | Lantz Arena (1,455); Charleston, IL |
| November 11, 2023*; 7:00 p.m., ESPN+ | | at Loyola–Chicago | L 65–89 | 1–2 | Joseph J. Gentile Arena (3,311); Chicago, IL |
| November 15, 2023*; 7:00 p.m., ESPN+ | | at Illinois State | L 61–69 | 1–3 | CEFCU Arena (3,061); Normal, IL |
| November 18, 2023*; 2:30 p.m., ESPN+ | | vs. Coppin State; Miami Classic | W 48–46 | 2–3 | Millett Hall (357); Oxford, OH |
| November 19, 2023*; 12:00 p.m., ESPN+ | | at Miami (OH); Miami Classic | L 64–76 | 2–4 | Millett Hall (1,063); Oxford, OH |
| November 25, 2023*; 2:00 p.m., ESPN+ | | Eureka | W 85–39 | 3–4 | Groniger Arena; Charleston, IL |
| November 28, 2023*; 7:00 p.m., ESPN+ | | at No. 5 Kansas | L 63–71 | 3–5 | Allen Fieldhouse (16,300); Lawrence, KS |
| December 2, 2023*; 2:00 p.m., ESPN+ | | UHSP | W 112–50 | 4–5 | Groniger Arena (1,085); Charleston, IL |
| December 7, 2023*; 7:00 p.m., ESPN+ | | IUPUI | W 75–58 | 5–5 | Groniger Arena (1,338); Charleston, IL |
| December 10, 2023*; 2:00 p.m., ESPN+ | | Central Arkansas | L 70–73 | 5–6 | Groniger Arena (1,060); Charleston, IL |
| December 17, 2023*; 2:00 p.m., ESPN+ | | Blackburn | W 87–66 | 6–6 | Groniger Arena (960); Charleston, IL |
| December 21, 2023*; 7:00 p.m., ESPN+ | | at Iowa State | L 48–80 | 6–7 | Hilton Coliseum (12,841); Ames, IA |
OVC regular season
| December 29, 2023; 7:30 p.m., ESPN+ | | at SIU Edwardsville | L 58–67 | 6–8 (0–1) | First Community Arena (1,627); Edwardsville, IL |
| January 4, 2024; 8:00 p.m., ESPN+ | | at UT Martin | W 79–72 | 7–8 (1–1) | Skyhawk Arena (1,368); Martin, TN |
| January 6, 2024; 3:00 p.m., ESPN+ | | at Little Rock | W 90–88 | 8–8 (2–1) | Jack Stephens Center (987); Little Rock, AR |
| January 11, 2024; 7:30 p.m., ESPN+ | | Morehead State | L 52–78 | 8–9 (2–2) | Groniger Arena (1,108); Charleston, IL |
| January 13, 2024; 3:30 p.m., ESPN+ | | Western Illinois | L 60–63 | 8–10 (2–3) | Groniger Arena (1,338); Charleston, IL |
| January 20, 2024; 3:30 p.m., ESPN+ | | at Lindenwood | W 78–68 | 9–10 (3–3) | Hyland Performance Arena (1,261); St. Charles, MO |
| January 25, 2024; 7:30 p.m., ESPN+ | | Tennessee Tech | W 68–59 | 10–10 (4–3) | Groniger Arena (1,439); Charleston, IL |
| January 27, 2024; 3:30 p.m., ESPN+ | | Tennessee State | L 60–64 | 10–11 (4–4) | Groniger Arena (1,533); Charleston, IL |
| February 1, 2024; 7:30 p.m., ESPN+ | | UT Martin | L 59–76 | 10–12 (4–5) | Groniger Arena (1,217); Charleston, IL |
| February 3, 2024; 3:30 p.m., ESPN+ | | Little Rock | L 47–71 | 10–13 (4–6) | Groniger Arena (1,192); Charleston, IL |
| February 8, 2024; 7:30 p.m., ESPN+ | | at Southern Indiana | W 81–71 | 11–13 (5–6) | Screaming Eagles Arena (1,877); Evansville, IN |
| February 10, 2024; 2:00 p.m., ESPN+ | | at Morehead State | L 57–69 | 11–14 (5–7) | Ellis Johnson Arena (2,578); Morehead, KY |
| February 15, 2024; 7:30 p.m., ESPN+ | | Southeast Missouri State | W 75–57 | 12–14 (6–7) | Groniger Arena (1,369); Charleston, IL |
| February 17, 2024; 3:30 p.m., ESPN+ | | Lindenwood | W 72–57 | 13–14 (7–7) | Groniger Arena (1,611); Charleston, IL |
| February 22, 2024; 7:30 p.m., ESPN+ | | at Tennessee State | L 73–78 | 13–15 (7–8) | Gentry Complex (1,072); Nashville, TN |
| February 24, 2024; 3:00 p.m., ESPN+ | | at Tennessee Tech | L 67–75 | 13–16 (7–9) | Eblen Center (1,544); Cookeville, TN |
| February 27, 2024; 7:30 p.m., ESPN+ | | SIU Edwardsville | W 84–79 | 14–16 (8–9) | Groniger Arena (1,628); Charleston, IL |
| February 29, 2024; 7:30 p.m., ESPN+ | | at Western Illinois | L 66–70 | 14–17 (8–10) | Western Hall (1,047); Macomb, IL |
OVC tournament
| March 6, 2024; 9:00 p.m., ESPN+ | (7) | vs. (6) SIU Edwardsville; First round | L 57–68 | 14–18 | Ford Center; Evansville, IN |
*Non-conference game. ^{#}Rankings from AP poll. (#) Tournament seedings in parentheses. All times are in Central.
