= 2023–24 UT Martin Skyhawks men's basketball team =

American college basketball season

2023–24 UT Martin Skyhawks men's basketball

Ohio Valley regular season co-champions
- Conference: Ohio Valley Conference
- Record: 21–11 (14–4 OVC)
- Head coach: Ryan Ridder (3rd season)
- Assistant coaches: Denver Cobb; Erik Buggs; Reed Ridder; Nashad Mackey; Jake Perrin
- Home arena: Skyhawk Arena

2023–24 Ohio Valley Conference men's basketball standings
	Conf.				Overall
Team	W		L	PCT	W		L	PCT
Little Rock	14	–	4	.778	21	–	13	.618
UT Martin	14	–	4	.778	21	–	11	.656
Morehead State †	14	–	4	.778	26	–	9	.743
Western Illinois	13	–	5	.722	21	–	12	.636
Tennessee State	10	–	8	.556	18	–	15	.545
SIU Edwardsville	9	–	9	.500	17	–	16	.515
Eastern Illinois	8	–	10	.444	14	–	18	.438
Southern Indiana*	5	–	13	.278	8	–	24	.250
Tennessee Tech	5	–	13	.278	10	–	21	.323
Southeast Missouri State	4	–	14	.222	9	–	22	.290
Lindenwood*	3	–	15	.167	9	–	22	.290
† 2024 OVC tournament winner * ineligible for the 2024 NCAA tournament due to transition period

The 2023–24 UT Martin Skyhawks men's basketball team represented the University of Tennessee at Martin during the 2023–24 NCAA Division I men's basketball season. The Skyhawks, led by third-year head coach Ryan Ridder, played their home games at Skyhawk Arena located in Martin, Tennessee as members of the Ohio Valley Conference.

== Previous season ==
The Skyhawks finished the 2022–23 season 19–14, 10–8 in OVC play to finish in a tie for third place. As the No. 3 seed in the OVC tournament, they defeated SIU Edwardsville, before losing to Tennessee Tech in the semifinals.

== Roster ==
2023–24 UT Martin Skyhawks men's basketball team
Players
Coaches

Pos.	#	Name	Height	Weight	Year	Previous school	Hometown
F	0	KK Curry	6 ft 6 in (1.98 m)	205 lb (93 kg)	Sr	South Alabama	Cleveland, Tennessee
G	1	Koby Jeffries	6 ft 3 in (1.91 m)	195 lb (88 kg)	RS Jr	UAB	Memphis, Tennessee
F	2	Issa Muhammad	6 ft 9 in (2.06 m)	245 lb (111 kg)	Sr	New Mexico State	Atlanta, Georgia
G	3	Jordan Sears	5 ft 11 in (1.8 m)	185 lb (84 kg)	Jr	Gardner–Webb	Daytona Beach, Florida
G	4	Justus Jackson	6 ft 1 in (1.85 m)	175 lb (79 kg)	Jr	Hawaii	Surprise, Arizona
F	5	Jalen Myers	6 ft 8 in (2.03 m)	200 lb (91 kg)	Jr	Hinds Community College	Huntsville, Alabama
G	10	Braylon Jackson	6 ft 0 in (1.83 m)	165 lb (75 kg)	Fr	Newnan High School	East Dublin, Georgia
G	11	Desmond Williams	6 ft 1 in (1.85 m)	190 lb (86 kg)	Sr	Troy	Montgomery, Alabama
F	13	Kenny White Jr.	6 ft 7 in (2.01 m)	225 lb (102 kg)	Jr	Murray State	Madisonville, Kentucky
F	15	Christian Fussell	6 ft 10 in (2.08 m)	220 lb (100 kg)	Jr	Middle Tennessee	Decatur, Georgia
G	21	Sebastian Mendoza	6 ft 3 in (1.91 m)	195 lb (88 kg)	Jr	San Bernardino Valley College	Riverside, California
F	32	Yassin Hussein	6 ft 9 in (2.06 m)	235 lb (107 kg)	Jr	Lake Land College	Cairo, Egypt
G/F	35	Jacob Crews	6 ft 8 in (2.03 m)	210 lb (95 kg)	Jr	Daytona State College	Hilliard, Florida
F	55	David Kamwanga	6 ft 7 in (2.01 m)	220 lb (100 kg)	Jr	Fork Union Military Academy	Kinshasa, DR Congo

Head coach

- Ryan Ridder (Embry–Riddle)

Assistant coach(es)

- Denver Cobb (Embry–Riddle)
- Erik Buggs (Valparaiso)
- Reed Ridder (Embry–Riddle)
- Nashad Mackey (Embry–Riddle)
- Jake Perrin (Penn State DuBois)

Legend

- (C) Team captain
- (S) Suspended
- (I) Ineligible
- (W) Walk-on
- Injured
- Current redshirt

Roster
Last update: November 28, 2023

== Schedule and results ==
Date time, TV	Rank^{#}	Opponent^{#}	Result	Record	Site (attendance) city, state
Non-conference regular season
November 6, 2023*; 6:00 pm, ESPN+		Champion Christian	W 104–76	1–0	Skyhawk Arena (1,087); Martin, TN
November 11, 2023*; 4:00 pm, SECN+/ESPN+		at Mississippi State	L 63–87	1–1	Humphrey Coliseum (7,525); Starkville, MS
November 13, 2023*; 6:00 pm, ESPN+		Brescia	W 90–72	2–1	Skyhawk Arena (1,062); Martin, TN
November 17, 2023*; 6:00 pm, ESPN+		at Eastern Kentucky; EKU Classic	W 80–74	3–1	Baptist Health Arena (2,459); Richmond, KY
November 19, 2023*; 12:00 pm, ESPN+		vs. Prairie View A&M; EKU Classic	L 66–78	3–2	Baptist Health Arena (150); Richmond, KY
November 22, 2023*; 2:00 pm, ESPN+		North Alabama	W 105–103 ^{2OT}	4–2	Skyhawk Arena (1,072); Martin, TN
November 25, 2023*; 2:00 pm		at Chicago State	W 94–71	5–2	Jones Convocation Center (76); Chicago, IL
November 30, 2023*; 7:00 pm, ESPN+		at Rice	L 78–98	5–3	Tudor Fieldhouse (1,656); Houston, TX
December 2, 2023*; 2:00 pm, ESPN+		at McNeese	L 80–91	5–4	The Legacy Center (2,269); Lake Charles, LA
December 10, 2023*; 2:00 pm, ESPN+		Ecclesia	W 110–52	6–4	Skyhawk Arena (731); Martin, TN
December 12, 2023*; 6:00 pm, ACCN		at NC State	L 67–81	6–5	PNC Arena (11,326); Raleigh, NC
December 18, 2023*; 7:00 pm, ESPN+		at Evansville	L 91–98	6–6	Ford Center (4,112); Evansville, IN
December 20, 2023*; 2:00 pm, ESPN+		William Woods	W 78–75	7–6	Skyhawk Arena (675); Martin, TN
OVC regular season
December 28, 2023; 7:30 pm, ESPN+		at Tennessee State	W 91–75	8–6 (1–0)	Gentry Complex (564); Nashville, TN
December 30, 2023; 3:00 pm, ESPN+		at Tennessee Tech	W 81–73	9–6 (2–0)	Eblen Center (1,227); Cookeville, TN
January 4, 2024; 7:30 pm, ESPN+		Eastern Illinois	L 72–79	9–7 (2–1)	Skyhawk Arena (1,368); Martin, TN
January 11, 2024; 7:30 pm, ESPN+		Western Illinois	L 64–73	9–8 (2–2)	Skyhawk Arena (1,598); Martin, TN
January 13, 2024; 3:30 pm, ESPN+		Little Rock	W 77–72	10–8 (3–2)	Skyhawk Arena (1,543); Martin, TN
January 18, 2024; 6:00 pm, ESPN+		at Morehead State	L 66–84	10–9 (3–3)	Ellis Johnson Arena (1,552); Morehead, KY
January 25, 2024; 7:30 pm, ESPN+		Southeast Missouri State	W 84–58	11–9 (4–3)	Skyhawk Arena (1,521); Martin, TN
January 27, 2024; 3:30 pm, ESPN+		Lindenwood	W 76–67	12–9 (5–3)	Skyhawk Arena (1,087); Martin, TN
February 1, 2024; 7:30 pm, ESPN+		at Eastern Illinois	W 76–59	13–9 (6–3)	Groniger Arena (1,217); Charleston, IL
February 3, 2024; 3:30 pm, ESPN+		at SIU Edwardsville	W 90–79	14–9 (7–3)	First Community Arena (1,639); Edwardsville, IL
February 6, 2024; 7:00 pm, ESPN+		at Little Rock	L 57–77	14–10 (7–4)	Jack Stephens Center (1,236); Little Rock, AR
February 10, 2024; 3:30 pm, ESPN+		at Western Illinois	W 62–59	15–10 (8–4)	Western Hall (1,448); Macomb, IL
February 15, 2024; 7:30 pm, ESPN+		Southern Indiana	W 77–68	16–10 (9–4)	Skyhawk Arena (911); Martin, TN
February 17, 2024; 3:30 pm, ESPN+		Morehead State	W 88–82	17–10 (10–4)	Skyhawk Arena (1,485); Martin, TN
February 22, 2024; 7:30 pm, ESPN+		at Lindenwood	W 106–86	18–10 (11–4)	Hyland Performance Arena (1,019); St. Charles, MO
February 24, 2024; 3:45 pm, ESPN+		at Southeast Missouri State	W 82–72	19–10 (12–4)	Show Me Center (1,367); Cape Girardeau, MO
February 29, 2024; 7:30 pm, ESPN+		Tennessee Tech	W 80–69	20–10 (13–4)	Skyhawk Arena (2,007); Martin, TN
March 2, 2024; 3:30 pm, ESPN+		Tennessee State	W 96–87	21–10 (14–4)	Skyhawk Arena (2,453); Martin, TN
OVC Tournament
March 8, 2024; 9:30 pm, ESPNU	(2)	vs. (3) Morehead State; Semifinals	L 78–84	21–11	Ford Center (1,277); Evansville, IN
*Non-conference game. ^{#}Rankings from AP Poll. (#) Tournament seedings in parentheses. All times are in Central.
