= 2023–24 Tennessee Tech Golden Eagles men's basketball team =

American college basketball season

2023–24 Tennessee Tech Golden Eagles men's basketball
- Conference: Ohio Valley Conference
- Record: 10–21 (5–13 OVC)
- Head coach: John Pelphrey (5th season)
- Assistant coaches: Alex Fain; Blake Gray; Andrew Steele
- Home arena: Eblen Center

2023–24 Ohio Valley Conference men's basketball standings
	Conf.				Overall
Team	W		L	PCT	W		L	PCT
Little Rock	14	–	4	.778	21	–	13	.618
UT Martin	14	–	4	.778	21	–	11	.656
Morehead State †	14	–	4	.778	26	–	9	.743
Western Illinois	13	–	5	.722	21	–	12	.636
Tennessee State	10	–	8	.556	18	–	15	.545
SIU Edwardsville	9	–	9	.500	17	–	16	.515
Eastern Illinois	8	–	10	.444	14	–	18	.438
Southern Indiana*	5	–	13	.278	8	–	24	.250
Tennessee Tech	5	–	13	.278	10	–	21	.323
Southeast Missouri State	4	–	14	.222	9	–	22	.290
Lindenwood*	3	–	15	.167	9	–	22	.290
† 2024 OVC tournament winner * ineligible for the 2024 NCAA tournament due to transition period

The 2023–24 Tennessee Tech Golden Eagles men's basketball team represented Tennessee Technological University during the 2023–24 NCAA Division I men's basketball season. The Golden Eagles, led by fifth-year head coach John Pelphrey, played their home games at the Eblen Center in Cookeville, Tennessee as members of the Ohio Valley Conference (OVC). They finished the season 10–21, 5–13 in OVC play, to finish in a tie for eighth place. They failed to qualify for the OVC tournament.

== Previous season ==
The Golden Eagles finished the 2022–23 season 16–17, 11–7 in OVC play, to finish in second place. They defeated UT Martin in the semifinals, before falling to Southeast Missouri State in overtime in the championship game of the OVC tournament.

== Roster ==
2023–24 Tennessee Tech Golden Eagles men's basketball team
Players
Coaches

Pos.	#	Name	Height	Weight	Year	Previous school	Hometown
F	0	Daniel Egbuniwe	6 ft 7 in (2.01 m)	210 lb (95 kg)	So	Little Rock	Memphis, TN
G	1	Diante Wood	6 ft 4 in (1.93 m)	210 lb (95 kg)	Sr	Jacksonville	Anniston, AL
G	2	Kyle Layton	6 ft 0 in (1.83 m)	175 lb (79 kg)	Fr	Mountain Brook High School	McKinney, TX
G	4	Josiah Davis	6 ft 3 in (1.91 m)	195 lb (88 kg)	So	West Virginia	Kitchener, ON
F	5	Rodney Jr. Johnson	6 ft 5 in (1.96 m)	220 lb (100 kg)	Jr	Weatherford College	Bryan, TX
G	10	Grant Slatten	6 ft 5 in (1.96 m)	195 lb (88 kg)	Jr	Ole Miss	Sparta, TN
G	11	Grant Strong	6 ft 6 in (1.98 m)	185 lb (84 kg)	So	Clay County High School	Celina, TN
G	12	Erik Oliver	6 ft 1 in (1.85 m)	195 lb (88 kg)	Sr	South Dakota	Cheyenne, WY
G	13	Jayvis Harvey	6 ft 5 in (1.96 m)	210 lb (95 kg)	Sr	Georgia Highlands College	Durham, NC
F	15	Rylee Samons	6 ft 7 in (2.01 m)	195 lb (88 kg)	Fr	Pikeville High School	Pikeville, KY
G	20	DeSean Woods	6 ft 0 in (1.83 m)	165 lb (75 kg)	Jr	Southern	Lexington, KY
G	23	David Early	6 ft 4 in (1.93 m)	235 lb (107 kg)	Jr	Marshall	Logan, WV
G	33	Bogdan Zimonjic	6 ft 5 in (1.96 m)	190 lb (86 kg)	Jr	Florida Atlantic	Belgrade, Serbia
C	34	David Craig	7 ft 2 in (2.18 m)	235 lb (107 kg)	So	Mercer	Johannesburg, South Africa
F	35	Jerome Beya	6 ft 9 in (2.06 m)	225 lb (102 kg)	So	Sunrise Christian Academy	Kinshasa, DR Congo
F	40	Nick Choate	6 ft 6 in (1.98 m)	185 lb (84 kg)	So	Livingston Academy	Livingston, TN

Head coach

- John Pelphrey (Kentucky)

Assistant coach(es)

- Alex Fain (Alabama)
- Blake Gray (Alabama)
- Andrew Steele (Alabama)

Legend

- (C) Team captain
- (S) Suspended
- (I) Ineligible
- (W) Walk-on
- Injured
- Current redshirt

Roster
Last update: November 29, 2023

== Schedule and results ==
Date time, TV	Rank^{#}	Opponent^{#}	Result	Record	Site (attendance) city, state
Exhibition
October 26, 2023*; 7:30 p.m.		UT Southern	L 70–74	–	Eblen Center; Cookeville, TN
November 1, 2023*; 7:00 p.m., ESPN+		at Austin Peay; Charity Exhibition	L 43–82	–	F&M Bank Arena; Clarksville, TN
Non-conference regular season
November 6, 2023*; 5:30 p.m., SECN+/ESPN+		at No. 9 Tennessee	L 42–80	0–1	Thompson–Boling Arena (17,046); Knoxville, TN
November 10, 2023*; 7:00 p.m., ESPN+		at Murray State	L 72–78	0–2	CFSB Center (4,769); Murray, KY
November 14, 2023*; 6:00 p.m., ESPN+		Lipscomb	L 65–96	0–3	Eblen Center (899); Cookeville, TN
November 16, 2023*; 6:00 p.m., ESPN+		Midway	W 82–70	1–3	Eblen Center (658); Cookeville, TN
November 19, 2023*; 1:00 p.m., ESPN+		at Chattanooga	L 63–68	1–4	McKenzie Arena (3,023); Chattanooga, TN
November 22, 2023*; 1:00 p.m., ESPN+		at Presbyterian	W 79–75 ^{OT}	2–4	Templeton Physical Education Center (276); Clinton, SC
November 28, 2023*; 6:00 p.m., ESPN+		Western Carolina; Southeast Triangular	L 65–69	2–5	Eblen Center (679); Cookeville, TN
November 30, 2023*; 7:00 p.m., ESPN+		at North Alabama; Southeast Triangular	L 71–86	2–6	CB&S Bank Arena (1,234); Florence, AL
December 3, 2023*; 3:00 p.m., ESPN+		Alice Lloyd	W 108–82	3–6	Eblen Center (613); Cookeville, TN
December 10, 2023*; 3:00 p.m., ESPN+		at East Tennessee State	L 72–73	3–7	Freedom Hall Civic Center (4,121); Johnson City, TN
December 12, 2023*; 6:00 p.m., ESPN+		Bethel (TN)	W 81–74	4–7	Eblen Center (465); Cookeville, TN
December 16, 2023*; 3:00 p.m., ESPN+		North Alabama	W 70–67	5–7	Eblen Center (701); Cookeville, TN
December 20, 2023*; 7:00 p.m., ESPN+		at Evansville	L 51–82	5–8	Ford Center (4,715); Evansville, IN
OVC regular season
December 28, 2023; 7:30 p.m., ESPN+		Little Rock	L 75–81	5–9 (0–1)	Eblen Center (1,111); Cookeville, TN
December 30, 2023; 3:00 p.m., ESPN+		UT Martin	L 73–81	5–10 (0–2)	Eblen Center (1,227); Cookeville, TN
January 4, 2024; 6:00 p.m., ESPN+		at Morehead State	L 57–82	5–11 (0–3)	Ellis Johnson Arena (1,655); Morehead, KY
January 6, 2024; 7:30 p.m., ESPN+		at Southern Indiana	W 73–59	6–11 (1–3)	Screaming Eagles Arena (2,460); Evansville, IN
January 13, 2024; 3:00 p.m., ESPN+		Southeast Missouri State	W 70–59	7–11 (2–3)	Eblen Center (1,210); Cookeville, TN
January 18, 2024; 7:30 p.m., ESPN+		at Tennessee State	L 53–85	7–12 (2–4)	Gentry Complex (2,571); Nashville, TN
January 25, 2024; 7:30 p.m., ESPN+		at Eastern Illinois	L 59–68	7–13 (2–5)	Groniger Arena (1,439); Charleston, IL
January 27, 2024; 3:30 p.m., ESPN+		at SIU Edwardsville	L 57–74	7–14 (2–6)	First Community Arena (2,157); Edwardsville, IL
February 1, 2024; 7:30 p.m., ESPN+		Southern Indiana	L 71–74	7–15 (2–7)	Eblen Center (1,712); Cookeville, TN
February 3, 2024; 3:00 p.m., ESPN+		Morehead State	L 60–67	7–16 (2–8)	Eblen Center (1,099); Cookeville, TN
February 8, 2024; 7:30 p.m., ESPN+		at Southeast Missouri State	L 69–88	7–17 (2–9)	Show Me Center (1,056); Cape Girardeau, MO
February 10, 2024; 3:30 p.m., ESPN+		at Lindenwood	W 62–53 ^{OT}	8–17 (3–9)	Hyland Performance Arena (1,165); St. Charles, MO
February 13, 2024; 7:30 p.m., ESPN+		Tennessee State	W 70–50	9–17 (4–9)	Eblen Center (1,141); Cookeville, TN
February 15, 2024; 7:30 p.m., ESPN+		Western Illinois	L 55–62	9–18 (4–10)	Eblen Center (998); Cookeville, TN
February 22, 2024; 7:30 p.m., ESPN+		SIU Edwardsville	L 77–78	9–19 (4–11)	Eblen Center (1,011); Cookeville, TN
February 24, 2024; 3:00 p.m., ESPN+		Eastern Illinois	W 75–67	10–19 (5–11)	Eblen Center (1,544); Cookeville, TN
February 29, 2024; 7:30 p.m., ESPN+		at UT Martin	L 69–80	10–20 (5–12)	Skyhawk Arena (2,007); Martin, TN
March 2, 2024; 3:00 p.m., ESPN+		at Little Rock	L 43–81	10–21 (5–13)	Jack Stephens Center (4,023); Little Rock, AR
*Non-conference game. ^{#}Rankings from AP poll. (#) Tournament seedings in parentheses. All times are in Central.
