= 2023–24 Tennessee State Tigers basketball team =

American college basketball season

2023–24 Tennessee State Tigers basketball
- Conference: Ohio Valley Conference
- Record: 18–15 (10–8 OVC)
- Head coach: Brian Collins (6th season)
- Assistant coaches: Jeremy Lewis; Russ Willemsen; Joshua Bone Jr.
- Home arena: Gentry Complex

2023–24 Ohio Valley Conference men's basketball standings
| | Conf. | | | | Overall |
| Team | W | | L | PCT | W | | L | PCT |
|---|---|---|---|---|---|---|---|---|
| Little Rock | 14 | – | 4 | .778 | 21 | – | 13 | .618 |
| UT Martin | 14 | – | 4 | .778 | 21 | – | 11 | .656 |
| Morehead State † | 14 | – | 4 | .778 | 26 | – | 9 | .743 |
| Western Illinois | 13 | – | 5 | .722 | 21 | – | 12 | .636 |
| Tennessee State | 10 | – | 8 | .556 | 18 | – | 15 | .545 |
| SIU Edwardsville | 9 | – | 9 | .500 | 17 | – | 16 | .515 |
| Eastern Illinois | 8 | – | 10 | .444 | 14 | – | 18 | .438 |
| Southern Indiana* | 5 | – | 13 | .278 | 8 | – | 24 | .250 |
| Tennessee Tech | 5 | – | 13 | .278 | 10 | – | 21 | .323 |
| Southeast Missouri State | 4 | – | 14 | .222 | 9 | – | 22 | .290 |
| Lindenwood* | 3 | – | 15 | .167 | 9 | – | 22 | .290 |
† 2024 OVC tournament winner * ineligible for the 2024 NCAA tournament due to transition period

The 2023–24 Tennessee State Tigers basketball team represented Tennessee State University during the 2023–24 NCAA Division I men's basketball season. The Tigers, led by sixth-year head coach Brian Collins, played their home games at the Gentry Complex in Nashville, Tennessee as members of the Ohio Valley Conference (OVC).

The Tigers finished the season 18–15, 10–8 in OVC play, to finish in fifth place. They defeated Southern Indiana before falling to Western Illinois in the quarterfinals of the OVC tournament.

== Previous season ==
The Tigers finished the 2022–23 season 18–14, 10–8 in OVC play, to finish in a three-way tie for third place. As the No. 4 seed in the OVC tournament, they lost in the quarterfinals to Southeast Missouri State.

== Roster ==
2023–24 Tennessee State Tigers men's basketball team
Players
Coaches

| Pos. | # | Name | Height | Weight | Year | Previous school | Hometown |
|---|---|---|---|---|---|---|---|
| G | 0 | Jaylen Jones | 6 ft 1 in (1.85 m) | 160 lb (73 kg) | Fr | East Magnet HS | Nashville, TN |
| G | 1 | Marcus Jr. Fitzgerald | 6 ft 2 in (1.88 m) | 182 lb (83 kg) | Jr | Pearl-Cohn HS | Nashville, TN |
| G | 2 | Christian Brown | 6 ft 6 in (1.98 m) | 205 lb (93 kg) | GS | Georgia | Hopkins, SC |
| G | 3 | Riggs Abner | 6 ft 6 in (1.98 m) | 195 lb (88 kg) | RS So | Green Hill HS | Mt. Juliet, TN |
| G | 4 | John III Gamble | 6 ft 6 in (1.98 m) | 195 lb (88 kg) | Fr | Charlotte HS | Port Charlotte, FL |
| G | 5 | E.J. Bellinger | 6 ft 4 in (1.93 m) | 205 lb (93 kg) | GS | Belmont | St. Peters, MO |
| G | 10 | Kinyon Hodges | 6 ft 2 in (1.88 m) | 180 lb (82 kg) | Sr | Eastern Illinois | Cape Girardeau, MO |
| G | 11 | Justin Williams | 6 ft 3 in (1.91 m) | 185 lb (84 kg) | Jr | West LA College | Los Angeles, CA |
| G | 12 | Denim Dawson | 6 ft 6 in (1.98 m) | 193 lb (88 kg) | RS So | Nebraska | San Bernardino, CA |
| F | 13 | Michael Shanks | 6 ft 6 in (1.98 m) | 210 lb (95 kg) | Sr | Belmont | Bentonville, AR |
| G | 20 | Jai Howard | 6 ft 0 in (1.83 m) | — | Jr | Chatt State | Birmingham, AL |
| F | 23 | Emmanuel Dowuona | 6 ft 10 in (2.08 m) | 245 lb (111 kg) | GS | Purdue | Miami, FL |
| F | 24 | Elijah Jointer | 6 ft 6 in (1.98 m) | 230 lb (104 kg) | Fr | Mount Carmel HS | Chicago, IL |
| F | 33 | Jason Jitoboh | 6 ft 11 in (2.11 m) | 300 lb (136 kg) | Sr | Florida | Abuja, Nigeria |
| F | 44 | David Acosta | 6 ft 11 in (2.11 m) | 247 lb (112 kg) | GS | Cloud County CC | Santiago, Dominican Republic |
| G | 55 | Knute Wood | 6 ft 4 in (1.93 m) | 191 lb (87 kg) | RS Fr | Brooks HS | Killen, AL |

Head coach

- Brian Collins (Belmont)

Assistant coach(es)

- Jeremy Lewis (Cumberland)
- Joshua Bone Jr. (Tennessee)

Legend

- (C) Team captain
- (S) Suspended
- (I) Ineligible
- (W) Walk-on
- Injured
- Current redshirt

Roster
Last update: November 28, 2023

== Schedule and results ==
| Date time, TV | Rank^{#} | Opponent^{#} | Result | Record | Site (attendance) city, state |
Non-conference regular season
| November 6, 2023*; 7:30 p.m., ESPN+ | | Fisk | W 76–61 | 1–0 | Gentry Complex (4,569); Nashville, TN |
| November 9, 2023*; 7:00 p.m., ESPN+ | | Kentucky State | W 83–58 | 2–0 | Gentry Complex (1,453); Nashville, TN |
| November 15, 2023*; 8:00 p.m., ESPN+ | | at Portland | W 75–65 | 3–0 | Chiles Center (923); Portland, OR |
| November 17, 2023*; 8:00 p.m., P12N | | at Oregon; Emerald Coast Classic campus-site game | L 67–92 | 3–1 | Matthew Knight Arena (5,279); Eugene, OR |
| November 20, 2023*; 7:00 am, ESPN+ | | Midway | W 87–70 | 4–1 | Gentry Complex (917); Nashville, TN |
| November 24, 2023*; 11:00 am, FloHoops | | vs. Mercer; Emerald Coast Classic semifinals | L 59–60 | 4–2 | Raider Arena (100); Niceville, FL |
| November 25, 2023*; 10:00 am, FloHoops | | vs. Southeastern Louisiana; Emerald Coast Classic third-place game | W 91–77 | 5–2 | Raider Arena (150); Niceville, FL |
| November 29, 2023*; 7:00 p.m., ESPN+ | | at Alabama A&M | L 83–85 ^{OT} | 5–3 | Alabama A&M Events Center (3,647); Huntsville, AL |
| December 2, 2023*; 6:00 p.m., ESPN+ | | Austin Peay | W 69–65 | 6–3 | Gentry Complex (4,564); Nashville, TN |
| December 10, 2023*; 4:00 p.m., ESPN+ | | at Lipscomb | L 71–78 | 6–4 | Allen Arena (1,961); Nashville, TN |
| December 13, 2023*; 7:00 p.m., ESPN+ | | at Liberty | L 52–74 | 6–5 | Liberty Arena (2,311); Lynchburg, VA |
| December 16, 2023*; 2:00 p.m., ESPN+ | | Boyce | W 117–59 | 7–5 | Gentry Complex (239); Nashville, TN |
| December 19, 2023*; 6:00 p.m., ESPN+ | | at Indiana State | L 69–90 | 7–6 | Hulman Center (4,291); Terre Haute, IN |
OVC regular season
| December 28, 2023; 7:30 p.m., ESPN+ | | UT Martin | L 75–91 | 7–7 (0–1) | Gentry Complex (564); Nashville, TN |
| December 30, 2023; 3:30 p.m., ESPN+ | | Little Rock | W 90–82 | 8–7 (1–1) | Gentry Complex (493); Nashville, TN |
| January 4, 2024; 7:30 p.m., ESPN+ | | at Southern Indiana | L 67–69 | 8–8 (1–2) | Screaming Eagles Arena (1,258); Evansville, IN |
| January 6, 2024; 2:30 p.m., ESPN+ | | at Morehead State | L 68–78 | 8–9 (1–3) | Ellis Johnson Arena (1,581); Morehead, KY |
| January 13, 2024; 3:30 p.m., ESPN+ | | Lindenwood | W 75–60 | 9–9 (2–3) | Gentry Complex (379); Nashville, TN |
| January 18, 2024; 7:30 p.m., ESPN+ | | Tennessee Tech | W 85–53 | 10–9 (3–3) | Gentry Complex (2,571); Nashville, TN |
| January 20, 2024; 3:30 p.m., ESPN+ | | at Western Illinois | W 58–57 | 11–9 (4–3) | Western Hall (1,046); Macomb, IL |
| January 27, 2024; 3:30 p.m., ESPN+ | | at Eastern Illinois | W 64–60 | 12–9 (5–3) | Groniger Arena (1,533); Charleston, IL |
| February 1, 2024; 7:30 p.m., ESPN+ | | Morehead State | L 49–68 | 12–10 (5–4) | Gentry Complex (1,178); Nashville, TN |
| February 3, 2024; 3:30 p.m., ESPN+ | | Southern Indiana | W 79–74 | 13–10 (6–4) | Gentry Complex (784); Nashville, TN |
| February 8, 2024; 7:30 p.m., ESPN+ | | at Lindenwood | W 65–55 | 14–10 (7–4) | Hyland Performance Arena (2,002); St. Charles, MO |
| February 10, 2024; 3:45 p.m., ESPN+ | | at Southeast Missouri State | W 77–74 | 15–10 (8–4) | Show Me Center (1,134); Cape Girardeau, MO |
| February 13, 2024; 7:30 p.m., ESPN+ | | at Tennessee Tech | L 50–70 | 15–11 (8–5) | Eblen Center (1,141); Cookeville, TN |
| February 17, 2024; 3:30 p.m., ESPN+ | | Western Illinois | L 61–68 | 15–12 (8–6) | Gentry Complex (1,479); Nashville, TN |
| February 22, 2024; 7:30 p.m., ESPN+ | | Eastern Illinois | W 78–73 | 16–12 (9–6) | Gentry Complex (1,072); Nashville, TN |
| February 24, 2024; 3:30 p.m., ESPN+ | | SIU Edwardsville | W 76–71 | 17–12 (10–6) | Gentry Complex (1,037); Nashville, TN |
| February 29, 2024; 7:00 p.m., ESPN+ | | at Little Rock | L 60–85 | 17–13 (10–7) | Jack Stephens Center (3,367); Little Rock, AR |
| March 2, 2024; 3:30 p.m., ESPN+ | | at UT Martin | L 87–96 | 17–14 (10–8) | Skyhawk Arena (2,453); Martin, TN |
OVC tournament
| March 6, 2024; 6:30 p.m., ESPN+ | (5) | vs. (8) Southern Indiana; First round | W 78–64 | 18–14 | Ford Center; Evansville, IN |
| March 7, 2024; 6:30 p.m., ESPN+ | (5) | vs. (4) Western Illinois; Quarterfinals | L 59–61 | 18–15 | Ford Center; Evansville, IN |
*Non-conference game. ^{#}Rankings from AP poll. (#) Tournament seedings in parentheses. All times are in Central.
