= George Rogers Clark High School =

George Rogers Clark High School may refer to:

- George Rogers Clark High School (Kentucky) - a public high school in Winchester, Kentucky
- George Rogers Clark Jr./Sr. High School - a former public secondary school in Whiting, Indiana
