= List of SIU Edwardsville Cougars men's basketball head coaches =

This is a list of SIU Edwardsville Cougars men's basketball head coaches.

| Team | Served | Record | W–L %age |
|---|---|---|---|
| Harry Gallatin | 1967–1970 | 19–31 | .380 |
| Jim Dudley | 1970–1981 | 131–143 | .478 |
| Tom Pugliese | 1981–1983 | 17–40 | .298 |
| Larry Graham | 1984–1992 | 147–84 | .636 |
| Jack Margenthaler | 1903–2002 | 112–150 | .412 |
| Marty Simmons | 2002–2007 | 88–49 | .642 |
| Lennox Forrester | 2007–2015 | 82–146 | .360 |
| Jon Harris | 2015–2019 | 31–88 | .261 |
| Brian Barone | 2019– | | |
