= SIU Edwardsville Cougars men's basketball statistical leaders =

The SIU Edwardsville Cougars men's basketball statistical leaders are individual statistical leaders of the SIU Edwardsville Cougars men's basketball program in various categories, including points, assists, blocks, rebounds, and steals. Within those areas, the lists identify single-game, single-season, and career leaders. The Cougars represent Southern Illinois University Edwardsville in the NCAA Division I Ohio Valley Conference.

SIU Edwardsville began competing in intercollegiate basketball in 1967. The NCAA did not officially record assists as a stat until the 1983–84 season, and blocks and steals until the 1985–86 season, but SIU Edwardsville's record books includes players in these stats before these seasons. These lists are updated through the end of the 2023–24 season.

== Scoring ==
Career
Rk	Player	Points	Seasons
1	Ray'Sean Taylor	1,962	2021–22 2022–23 2023–24 2024–25
2	Jason Holmes	1,949	1993–94 1994–95 1995–96 1996–97
3	Keil Peebles	1,824	1975–76 1976–77 1977–78 1978–79
4	Shamar Wright	1,549	2019–20 2020–21 2021–22 2022–23 2023–24
5	Mark Yelovich	1,467	2008–09 2009–10 2010–11 2011–12 2012–13
6	Kris Davis	1,305	2011–12 2012–13 2013–14 2014–15
7	John Edwards	1,267	1985–86 1986–87
8	J.B. Jones	1,186	2004–05 2005–06 2006–07 2007–08
9	Kenny Stanley	1,171	1984–85 1985–86 1986–87
10	Keith McFarland	1,116	1973–74 1974–75

Season
Rk	Player	Points	Season
1	John Edwards	692	1986–87
2	Ray'Sean Taylor	648	2024–25
3	Keith McFarland	621	1974–75
4	John Edwards	575	1985–86
5	Jason Holmes	552	1993–94
6	James Jappa	537	1986–87
7	Tony Johnson	532	1972–73
8	Keil Peebles	527	1976–77
9	Jason Holmes	516	1994–95
10	Damarco Minor	511	2023–24

Single game
Rk	Player	Points	Season	Opponent
1	Jason Holmes	45	1993–94	Carthage

== Rebounds ==
Career
Rk	Player	Rebounds	Seasons
1	Bill Branz	1,057	1976–77 1977–78 1978–79 1979–80
2	Travis Wallbaum	753	1996–97 1997–98 1998–99 1999–00
3	Vince Barnett	694	1974–75 1975–76 1976–77 1977–78
4	Jim Allen	665	1975–76 1976–77 1977–78 1978–79
5	Shamar Wright	649	2019–20 2020–21 2021–22 2022–23 2023–24
6	Tim Bauersachs	585	2001–02 2002–03 2003–04 2004–05
7	Mark Yelovich	579	2008–09 2009–10 2010–11 2011–12 2012–13
8	Nathan Kreke	570	1994–95 1995–96 1996–97 1997–98
9	Leon Wright	539	1972–73 1973–74
10	Nikola Bundalo	529	2007–08 2008–09 2009–10 2010–11

Season
Rk	Player	Rebounds	Season
1	Dan Donahue	419	1974–75
2	Bill Branz	367	1979–80
3	Leon Wright	315	1973–74
4	Pete Catchings	313	1975–76
5	Doug Young	302	1973–74
6	Bill Branz	295	1978–79
7	Damarco Minor	280	2023–24
8	Vince Barnett	248	1974–75
9	DeeJuan Pruitt	246	2022–23
10	Bernie Pitts	242	1969–70

Single game
Rk	Player	Rebounds	Season	Opponent
1	Doug Young	26	1973–74	Blackburn

== Assists ==
Career
Rk	Player	Assists	Seasons
1	J.B. Jones	565	2004–05 2005–06 2006–07 2007–08
2	Keil Peebles	437	1975–76 1976–77 1977–78 1978–79
3	Ray'Sean Taylor	373	2021–22 2022–23 2023–24 2024–25
4	Brian Karvinen	370	1991–92 1992–93 1993–94
5	Shaun Smoot	316	1995–96 1996–97 1997–98
6	Kenny Stanley	299	1984–85 1985–86 1986–87
7	Frankie Williams	293	1985–86 1986–87 1987–88 1988–89
8	Kris Davis	277	2011–12 2012–13 2013–14 2014–15
9	Tony Johnson	261	1971–72 1972–73
10	Tim Bauersachs	257	2001–02 2002–03 2003–04 2004–05
	Christian Ellis	257	2016–17 2017–18 2018–19

Season
Rk	Player	Assists	Season
1	Rich Essington	177	1970–71
2	Jack Campion	167	2025–26
3	J.B. Jones	163	2004–05
4	J.B. Jones	157	2006–07
5	Brian Karvinen	149	1993–94
6	J.B. Jones	144	2005–06
7	Donivine Stewart	139	2013–14
8	Tyresse Williford	132	2019–20
	Tony Johnson	132	1972–73
10	Tony Johnson	129	1971–72

Single game
Rk	Player	Assists	Season	Opponent
1	Rich Essington	16	1970–71	Illinois-Chicago

== Steals ==
Career
Rk	Player	Steals	Seasons
1	J.B. Jones	227	2004–05 2005–06 2006–07 2007–08
2	Ray'Sean Taylor	184	2021–22 2022–23 2023–24 2024–25
3	Shamar Wright	177	2019–20 2020–21 2021–22 2022–23 2023–24
4	Kenny Stanley	143	1984–85 1985–86 1986–87
5	Brian Karvinen	119	1991–92 1992–93 1993–94
6	Mark Yelovich	111	2008–09 2009–10 2010–11 2011–12 2012–13
7	Shaun Smoot	110	1995–96 1996–97 1997–98
8	Frankie Williams	108	1985–86 1986–87 1987–88 1988–89
9	James Jappa	106	1985–86 1986–87
10	Jason Holmes	105	1993–94 1994–95 1995–96 1996–97

Season
Rk	Player	Steals	Season
1	Ryan Belcher	101	2005–06
2	Ray'Sean Taylor	65	2024–25
3	J.B. Jones	62	2006–07
	J.B. Jones	62	2005–06
	Anthony Smith	62	1993–94
6	Brian Karvinen	61	1993–94
7	Jack Campion	59	2025–26
8	J.B. Jones	55	2004–05
	Kenny Stanley	55	1986–87
10	James Jappa	54	1986–87

Single game
Rk	Player	Steals	Season	Opponent
1	Brian Karvinen	8	1993–94	Bellarmine
	Ryan Belcher	8	2005–06	Saginaw Valley State

== Blocks ==
Career
Rk	Player	Blocks	Seasons
1	Arnas Sakenis	160	2022–23 2023–24 2024–25 2025–26
2	Doug Taylor	147	2004–05 2005–06 2006–07 2007–08
3	Lamar Wright	138	2019–20 2020–21 2021–22 2022–23 2023–24
4	Dan Heimos	134	2003–04 2004–05
5	Keaton Jackson	123	2013–14 2014–15
6	Keenan Simmons	117	2014–15 2015–16 2016–17 2017–18
7	Nikola Bundalo	104	2007–08 2008–09 2009–10 2010–11
8	Shamar Wright	103	2019–20 2020–21 2021–22 2022–23 2023–24
9	Antone Gallishaw	102	1988–89 1989–90
10	Jalen Henry	81	2014–15 2015–16 2016–17 2017–18

Season
Rk	Player	Blocks	Season
1	Dan Heimos	87	2004–05
2	Arnas Sakenis	75	2025–26
3	Keaton Jackson	65	2013–14
4	Antone Gallishaw	58	1989–90
	Keaton Jackson	58	2014–15
6	Lamar Wright	50	2020–21
7	Doug Taylor	49	2007–08
8	Arnas Sakenis	48	2024–25
9	Dan Heimos	47	2003–04
10	Doug Taylor	45	2006–07

Single game
Rk	Player	Blocks	Season	Opponent
1	Doug Taylor	8	2007–08	St. Josephs
	Michael Chandler	8	2015–16	Southeast Missouri
