= 2019–20 SIU Edwardsville Cougars men's basketball team =

American college basketball season

2019–20 SIU Edwardsville Cougars men's basketball
- Conference: Ohio Valley Conference
- Record: 8–23 (5–13 OVC)
- Head coach: Brian Barone (1st season)
- Assistant coach: Charles "Bubba" Wells; Mike Waldo; Troy Pierce; Colin Schneider (director of basketball operations); Detae McMurray (graduate assistant for player development)
- Home arena: First Community Arena at Vadalabene Center

2019–20 Ohio Valley Conference men's basketball standings
	Conf.				Overall
Team	W		L	PCT	W		L	PCT
Belmont †	15	–	3	.833	26	–	7	.788
Murray State	15	–	3	.833	23	–	9	.719
Austin Peay	14	–	4	.778	21	–	12	.636
Eastern Kentucky	12	–	6	.667	16	–	17	.485
Tennessee State	9	–	9	.500	18	–	15	.545
Eastern Illinois	9	–	9	.500	17	–	15	.531
Jacksonville State	8	–	10	.444	13	–	19	.406
Morehead State	7	–	11	.389	13	–	19	.406
Tennessee Tech	6	–	12	.333	9	–	22	.290
UT Martin	5	–	13	.278	9	–	20	.310
SIU Edwardsville	5	–	13	.278	8	–	23	.258
Southeast Missouri State	3	–	15	.167	7	–	24	.226
† 2020 OVC tournament winner

The 2019–20 SIU Edwardsville Cougars men's basketball team represented Southern Illinois University Edwardsville during the 2019–20 NCAA Division I men's basketball season. The Cougars, led by first-year head coach Brian Barone, played their home games in the First Community Arena at Vadalabene Center in Edwardsville, Illinois as members of the Ohio Valley Conference. They finished the season 8–23, 5–13 in OVC play to finish in a tie for tenth place. They failed to qualify for the OVC tournament.

== Previous season ==
The Cougars finished the 2018–19 season 10–21, 6–12 in OVC play to finish in a three-way tie for seventh place. The Cougars received the No. 8 seed in the OVC Tournament where they lost in the first round to Morehead State.

On March 11, 2019, SIUE announced that coach Jon Harris' contract had not been renewed after a four-year record of 31–88.

== Preseason ==
On the day after Jon Harris' termination was announced, Brian Barone was named as interim head coach and was quickly confirmed with a two-year contract only days later.

Troy Pierce was hired to fill the assistant coach vacancy created by Barone's promotion.

Director of Operations Casey Wyllie left to be an assistant coach at Olney Central College and was replaced by Colin Schneider.

Nine players, five of whom saw major playing time, returned- from the 10–21 team of 2018–10. They are joined by one junior who saw major action as a freshman and sophomore but sat out last season as a medical "redshirt", two freshmen, three transfers from major junior college programs, and one transfer from another Division I program. Of the three members of the squad who are former walk-ons, two are in their second season as Cougars, and one is in his fourth year.

In a vote of conference coaches and sports information directors, SIUE was picked to finish in 10th place in the OVC.

== Postseason ==
Finishing tied for tenth place, the Cougars did not qualify for the OVC Tournament.

== Roster ==
Source =

2019–20 SIU Edwardsville Cougars men's basketball team
Players
Coaches

Pos.	#	Name	Height	Weight	Year	Previous school	Hometown
F	0	Treavon Martin	6 ft 8 in (2.03 m)	210 lb (95 kg)	So	Curie HS	Chicago, IL
G	1	Kenyon Duling	6 ft 2 in (1.88 m)	205 lb (93 kg)	So	Cowley CC/Morgan Park HS	Chicago, IL
G	2	D'Quan Applewhite (xW)	6 ft 3 in (1.91 m)	180 lb (82 kg)	RS Sr	Thornton Township HS	Harvey, IL
G	5	Mike Adewunmi	6 ft 5 in (1.96 m)	205 lb (93 kg)	Jr	McLennan CC/Lake Ridge HS	Dallas, TX
G	11	Tyresse Williford	5 ft 10 in (1.78 m)	165 lb (75 kg)	Sr	Wabash Valley CC/Marshall HS	Chicago, IL
G	14	Zeke Moore	6 ft 7 in (2.01 m)	200 lb (91 kg)	Jr	Tulsa/Riverview Gardens HS	Granite City, IL
G	21	Blake Lindenmeyer (xW)	6 ft 0 in (1.83 m)	180 lb (82 kg)	So	Arcola HS	Arcola, IL
G	22	Justin Benton	6 ft 4 in (1.93 m)	195 lb (88 kg)	Sr	Houston HS	Memphis, TN
C	23	Elochukwu Eze (injured)	6 ft 10 in (2.08 m)	240 lb (109 kg)	So	Asheville Christian Academy	Enugu, Nigeria
F	24	Cameron Williams	6 ft 2 in (1.88 m)	190 lb (86 kg)	So	Hazelwood Central HS	St. Louis, MO
F	30	Anselm Uzuegbunem	6 ft 7 in (2.01 m)	235 lb (107 kg)	Sr	Northern Oklahoma CC/Harding Charter Prep HS	Oklahoma City, OK
G	31	Jackson Best (xW)	5 ft 9 in (1.75 m)	165 lb (75 kg)	Jr	Edwardsville HS	Edwardsville, IL
F	32	Brandon Jackson	6 ft 7 in (2.01 m)	215 lb (98 kg)	Sr	Cardinal Ritter HS	East St. Louis, IL
F	42	Shamar Wright	6 ft 7 in (2.01 m)	185 lb (84 kg)	Fr	Link Year Prep/Murrieta Mesa HS	Murrieta, CA
G	52	Iziah James	6 ft 0 in (1.83 m)	180 lb (82 kg)	Jr	Indian Hills CC/Cape Henry Collegiate School	Chesapeake, VA
F	55	Lamar Wright	6 ft 7 in (2.01 m)	185 lb (84 kg)	Fr	Link Year Prep/Murrieta Mesa HS	Murrieta, CA

Head coach

- Brian Barone (Marquette)

Assistant coach(es)

- Bubba Wells (Austin Peay)
- Mike Waldo (SIUE)
- Troy Pierce (Emporia State)

Legend

- (C) Team captain
- (S) Suspended
- (I) Ineligible
- (W) Walk-on
- Injured
- Current redshirt

Roster

== Schedule and results ==
Date time, TV	Opponent	Result	Record	High points	High rebounds	High assists	Site (attendance) city, state
Exhibition
October 29, 2019*; 7:00 pm, ESPN+	Fontbonne	W 104–57		15 – Williford	7 – L. Wrught	5 – Williams	First Community Arena at Vadalabene Center (833); Edwardsville, IL
Non-conference regular season
November 5, 2019*; 7:30 pm, ESPN+	Quincy	W 61–52	1–0	17 – Williams	7 – Adewunmi	5 – Williford	First Community Arena at Vadalabene Center (902); Edwardsville, IL
November 8, 2019*; 8:00 pm, BTN	Iowa	L 60–87	1–1	10 – Duling & Williams	7 – Uzuegbunim	3 – Williams & S.Wright	Carver–Hawkeye Arena (10,300); Iowa City, IA
November 12, 2019*; 7:00 pm, ESPN+	Valparaiso	L 76–89	1–2	17 – Jackson & Williford	10 – Adewunmi	7 – Williford	First Community Arena at Vadalabene Center (778); Edwardsville, IL
November 16, 2019*; 1:00 pm	Incarnate Word	W 57–55	2–2	12 – Adewunmi	9 – Adewunmi	4 – Williford	McDermott Center (96); San Antonio, TX
November 18, 2019*; 7:00 pm	South Dakota	L 56–72	2–3	15 – Moore	6 – Adewunmi & Williford	3 – Williams	Sanford Coyote Sports Center (1,833); Vermillion, SD
November 23, 2019*; 2:00 pm, ESPN+	Northern Illinois	L 64–68	2–4	18 – Williford	9 – Adewunmi	8 – Williford	First Community Arena at Vadalabene Center (627); Edwardsville, IL
November 26, 2019*; 9:00 pm	Pacific	L 50–78	2–5	11 – Williford	4 – Adewunmi, Martin & Williford	4 – Williford	Alex G. Spanos Center (1,102); Stockton, CA
November 29, 2019*; 4:00 pm	UC Riverside	L 51–69	2–6	14 – James	5 – Adewunmi & Williams	3 – Uzuegbunem & Williams	Student Recreation Center Arena (304); Riverside, CA
December 4, 2019*; 7:30 pm, ESPN+	Chicago State	L 81–89	2–7	28 – Moore	7 – Team	5 – Williams	First Community Arena at Vadalabene Center (607); Edwardsville, IL
December 15, 2019*; 3:00 pm, ESPNU	Northwestern	L 54–72	2–8	18 – Moore	7 – Moore	3 – Benton & Uzuegbunem	Welsh–Ryan Arena (5,464); Evanston, IL
December 17, 2019*; 10:00 am	Winthrop	L 73–93	2–9	15 – Moore & Williams	4 – Moore & S.Wright	6 – Williford	Winthrop Coliseum (5,312); Rock Hill, SC
December 21, 2019*; 2:00 pm	Detroit Mercy	L 55–81	2–10	16 – Uzuegbunem	5 – Uzuegbunem	3 – Williams	Calihan Hall (1,003); Detroit, MI
December 29, 2019*; 2:00 pm	Lindenwood–Belleville	W 96–48	3–10	18 – Moore	8 – Adewunmi	5 – Williams & Williford	First Community Arena at Vadalabene Center (447); Edwardsville, IL
Ohio Valley Conference regular season
January 2, 2020; 7:00 pm, ESPN+	Belmont	W 79–69	4–10 (1–0)	17 – Moore	12 – Williams	4 – Williford	Curb Event Center (1,960); Nashville, TN
January 4, 2020; 4:00 pm, ESPN+	Tennessee State	L 74–79	4–11 (1–1)	22 – Moore	5 – Williford	4 – Williford	Gentry Complex (905); Nashville, TN
January 9, 2020; 6:00 pm, ESPN+	Morehead State	L 77–84	4–12 (1–2)	25 – Williams	8 – Team	5 – Williford	Ellis Johnson Arena (1,157); Morehead, KY
January 11, 2020; 4:00 pm, ESPN+	Eastern Kentucky	L 72–78	4–13 (1–3)	20 – Williford	6 – Williford	5 – Williford	McBrayer Arena (1,767); Richmond, KY
January 16, 2020; 7:30 pm, ESPN+	Tennessee Tech	L 69–72	4–14 (1–4)	16 – Moore	6 – Adewunmi & Williams	7 – Williford	First Community Arena at Vadalabene Center (527); Edwardsville, IL
January 18, 2020; 3:30 pm, ESPN+	Jacksonville State	L 56–64	4–15 (1–5)	16 – Moore	6 – Wright	2 – Adewunmi, Duling & James	First Community Arena at Vadalabene Center (1,061); Edwardsville, IL
January 23, 2020; 7:30 pm, ESPN+	Southeast Missouri State	W 84–65	5–15 (2–5)	23 – Adewunmi	10 – Williams	9 – Williford	First Community Arena at Vadalabene Center (655); Edwardsville, IL
January 25, 2020; 4:30 pm, ESPN+	UT Martin	L 76–79	5–16 (2–6)	18 – S.Wright	5 – Moore & S.Wright	5 – Williford	First Community Arena at Vadalabene Center (740); Edwardsville, IL
January 30, 2020; 8:00 pm, ESPN+	Austin Peay	L 58–82	5–17 (2–7)	14 – Williams	5 – Uzuegbunem	3 – Williford	Dunn Center (1,729); Clarksville, TN
February 1, 2020; 7:00 pm, ESPN+	Murray State	L 55–74	5–18 (2–8)	22 – Williford	6 – Uzuegbunem & S. Wright	2 – Adewunmi & Moore	CFSB Center (7,512); Murray, KY
February 6, 2020; 7:00 pm, ESPN+	Morehead State	L 49–58	5–19 (2–9)	13 – Moore	9 – Adewunmi	3 – Williams & Williford	First Community Arena at Vadalabene Center (856); Edwardsville, IL
February 8, 2020; 3:30 pm, ESPN+	Eastern Kentucky	W 83–75	6–19 (3–9)	20 – S.Wright	10 – Uzuegbunem	5 – Williford	First Community Arena at Vadalabene Center (840); Edwardsville, IL
February 13, 2020; 7:30 pm, ESPN+	Eastern Illinois	W 76–74	7–19 (4–9)	25 – Adewunmi	11 – Adewunmi	7 – Williford	Lantz Arena (1,111); Charleston, IL
February 15, 2020; 4:00 pm, ESPN+	Southeast Missouri State	L 71–75	7–20 (4–10)	16 – Moore	8 – Williford	5 – Williford	Show Me Center (1,678); Cape Girardeau, MO
February 20, 2020; 7:30 pm, ESPN+	Austin Peay	L 60–78	7–21 (4–11)	10 – Moore	8 – S.Wright	5 – Williford	First Community Arena at Vadalabene Center (568); Edwardsville, IL
February 22, 2020; 2:00 pm, ESPN+	Murray State	L 58–59	7–21 (4–12)	14 – Williford	7 – Uzuegbunem & S.Wright	7 – Williford	First Community Arena at Vadalabene Center (747); Edwardsville, IL
February 27, 2020; 7:30 pm, ESPN+	UT Martin	W 90–75	8-22 (5-12)	21 – Jackson	7 – Team	7 – Williford	SKyhawk Arena (813); Martin, TN
February 29, 2020; 2:00 pm, ESPN+	Eastern Illinois	L 52–70	8–23 (5–12)	17 – Williford	6 – Jackson	2 – Adewunmi & James	First Community Arena at Vadalabene Center (1,021); Edwardsville, IL
*Non-conference game. ^{#}Rankings from AP Poll. (#) Tournament seedings in parentheses. All times are in Central Time; Source.
