= Larry Graham (disambiguation) =

Larry Graham (born 1946) is an American bassist and baritone singer.

Larry Graham may also refer to:

- Larry Graham (basketball) (1942–2020), American college basketball coach
- Larry Graham (politician) (born 1950), Australian politician
