= Brian Barone =

American basketball coach

Current position
- Title: Head coach
- Team: SIU Edwardsville
- Conference: OVC
- Record: 107–116 (.480)

Biographical details
- Born: December 15, 1977 (age 48); Chicago, Illinois, U.S.

Playing career
- 1996–1998: Texas A&M
- 1998–2000: Marquette
- Position: Guard

Coaching career (HC unless noted)
- 2001–2002: Central Florida CC (assistant)
- 2002–2003: Garden City CC (assistant)
- 2003–2007: Illinois State (assistant)
- 2010–2014: Green Bay (assistant)
- 2014–2015: Green Bay (associate HC)
- 2015: Butler CC
- 2017–2019: SIU Edwardsville (assistant)
- 2019–present: SIU Edwardsville

Administrative career (AD unless noted)
- 2007–2008: Marquette (CBO & VC)
- 2008–2010: Indiana (DBO)

Head coaching record
- Overall: 107–116 (.480)
- Tournaments: 0–1 (NCAA Division I)

Accomplishments and honors

Championships
- OVC tournament (2025)

Brian Barone is the head coach of the men's basketball team at Southern Illinois University Edwardsville (SIUE), an NCAA Division I program competing in the Ohio Valley Conference (OVC).

== Coaching history ==
Barone began his coaching career as a junior college assistant at Central Florida Community College, then at Garden City Community College in Kansas.

He began his Division I coaching career at Illinois State under head coach Porter Moser, currently the head men's basketball coach at Oklahoma. After five seasons at ISU, he became the coordinator of basketball operations and video coordinator at Marquette under head coach Tom Crean. He followed Crean to Indiana to serve as IU's director of basketball operations/video coordinator.

Barone returned to coaching on the bench as assistant to former Marquette teammate and current Bradley head coach Brian Wardle at Green Bay. Moving up to associate head coach, Barone was expected to succeed Wardle when he left Green Bay. It was a surprise to the college basketball community when Linc Darner was named to the post.

After not getting the Green Bay job, Barone was named the head coach at Butler Community College, replacing his Marquette teammate Mike Bargen.

Barone was out of coaching for most of the next two years. On June 6, 2017, he was named assistant to former Marquette teammate Jon Harris at SIU Edwardsville. On March 11, 2019, SIUE announced that coach Jon Harris' contract had not been renewed after a four-year record of 31 wins and 88 losses. However, in a highly unusual move, all of Harris' staff of assistant coaches Brian Barone, Charles "Bubba" Wells, and Mike Waldo and Director of Operations Casey Wyllie was retained, and Barone was later initially named as interim head coach. The interim tag was removed when Barone was confirmed as head coach by the SIU board of trustees, and his contract was then extended through the 2023–24 season.

== Early life and playing career ==
Barone was born December 15, 1977, in Chicago, Illinois shortly before his family moved to Peoria, Illinois where his father Tony Barone Sr. became an assistant coach of the Bradley Braves men's basketball team. He started playing college basketball for his father, then head coach of the Texas A&M Aggies. He earned honorable mention on the All-Big XII team as a sophomore, as well as being named to the Big XII Academic All-Conference team. When his father left A&M to coach in the NBA, Barone transferred to Marquette. After "redshirting" a season under NCAA transfer rules, he played two seasons for Marquette, becoming team captain and a member of the Conference USA All-Academic Team.

Barone earned a bachelor's in communications from Marquette in 2000 and followed that with a master's degree in communications from Marquette in 2002.

== Personal life ==
Barone and his wife, Mimi, have a son, Carson, and three daughters, Ava, Gianna and Cecilia.

== Head coaching record ==
Record table
| Season | Team | Overall | Conference | Standing | Postseason |
|---|---|---|---|---|---|
SIU Edwardsville Cougars (Ohio Valley Conference) (2019–present)
| 2019–20 | SIU Edwardsville | 8–23 | 5–13 | T–10th | |
| 2020–21 | SIU Edwardsville | 9–17 | 7–12 | 8th | |
| 2021–22 | SIU Edwardsville | 11–21 | 5–13 | 8th | |
| 2022–23 | SIU Edwardsville | 19–14 | 9–9 | T–6th | |
| 2023–24 | SIU Edwardsville | 17–16 | 9–9 | 6th | |
| 2024–25 | SIU Edwardsville | 22–12 | 13–7 | 2nd | NCAA Division I Round of 64 |
| 2025–26 | SIU Edwardsville | 19–13 | 12–8 | 5th | |
| 2026–27 | SIU Edwardsville | 2–0 | 0–0 | | |
| SIU Edwardsville: | | 107–116 (.480) | 60–71 (.458) | | |
| Total: | | 107–116 (.480) | | | |
National champion Postseason invitational champion Conference regular season champion Conference regular season and conference tournament champion Division regular season champion Division regular season and conference tournament champion Conference tournament champion
