= Zeke Moore =

Zeke Moore may refer to:

- Zeke Moore (American football) (born 1943), American football player
- Zeke Moore (basketball) (born 1997), Trinidadian-American basketball player
