= William Small (basketball) =

American basketball coach

Current position
- Title: Assistant Coach
- Team: South Florida
- Conference: The American

Biographical details
- Born: Winona, Mississippi

Playing career
- 1991–1993: Belhaven

Coaching career (HC unless noted)
- 1994–1995: Delta State (assistant)
- 1995–1997: Cowley CC (assistant)
- 1997–1998: Alabama–Huntsville (assistant)
- 1999–2000: Tennessee–Martin (assistant)
- 2000–2003: Southeastern Louisiana (assistant)
- 2003–2005: Western Kentucky (assistant)
- 2005–2006: Troy (assistant)
- 2006–2007: Tulane (assistant)
- 2007–2010: Georgia State (assistant)
- 2010–2011: UTEP (assistant)
- 2011–2015: Murray State (assistant)
- 2015–2021: Iowa State (assistant)
- 2021–2023: Kennesaw State (assistant)
- 2023–present: South Florida (assistant)

William Small is an American basketball coach who is currently an assistant coach for the South Florida Bulls.

== Early coaching career ==
Small is originally from Winona, Mississippi and attended Belhaven University in Jackson, Mississippi where he played varsity basketball for two years, completing his bachelor's degree in 1993. He started his coaching career immediately following his playing days, his first job was as a graduate assistant at Delta State. He then moved onto Cowley Community College in Arkansas City, Kansas for two years from 1995–1997. From 1997–1998, he was an assistant coach at Alabama-Huntsville. Small then moved onto the UT Martin Skyhawks for the 1999–2000 season. He spent the next three seasons at Southeastern Louisiana.

Small then got his first Division I coaching job at Western Kentucky where he stayed from 2003–2005. While at Western Kentucky, Small recruited Courtney Lee, who was the Sun Belt Freshman of the Year eventual 2008 first round NBA draft pick by the Orlando Magic. Lee has also played for the Nets, Rockets, Celtics and currently plays for the Grizzlies.

After his time at WKU, William moved onto Troy from 2003–2005 and then the Tulane Green Wave for the 2006–2007 season. He then moved onto Georgia State from 2007–2010. His next assistant coaching job was under former Iowa State head coach, Tim Floyd, at UTEP.

== Murray State ==
Small then took an assistant job at Murray State where he flourished. He was part of the Racers’ 2011–12 season in which they spent 13 weeks in the national polls and rose as high as 10th, while becoming the last undefeated team at 23-0. The Racers produced their highest seed in 15 NCAA Tournament appearances, a No. 6 seed, and won the third game in the history of the program with a win over Colorado State. The Racers won a school and Ohio Valley Conference record 31 games and were the only team in Division I that went undefeated in road games at 13-0. He is credited with being the lead recruiter for Murray State on Cameron Payne, who was a first-round NBA Draft pick.

== Iowa State University ==
When Steve Prohm was hired as the head coach at Iowa State, he took Small with him to serve as an assistant.
