= 2011–12 Murray State Racers men's basketball team =

American college basketball season

2011–12 Murray State Racers men's basketball

OVC Regular Season & tournament champions Great Alaska Shootout Champions

NCAA Tournament, Second Round
- Conference: Ohio Valley Conference

Ranking
- Coaches: No. 16
- AP: No. 12
- Record: 31–2 (15–1 OVC)
- Head coach: Steve Prohm (1st season)
- Assistant coaches: William Small; Matt McMahon; Tim MacAllister; James Kane
- Home arena: CFSB Center

2011–12 Ohio Valley Conference men's basketball standings
	Conf.				Overall
Team	W		L	PCT	W		L	PCT
No. 12 Murray State †	15	–	1	.938	31	–	2	.939
Tennessee State	11	–	5	.688	20	–	13	.606
Morehead State	10	–	6	.625	18	–	15	.545
Tennessee Tech	9	–	7	.563	19	–	14	.576
Southeast Missouri State	9	–	7	.563	15	–	16	.484
Austin Peay	8	–	8	.500	12	–	20	.375
Jacksonville State	8	–	8	.500	15	–	18	.455
Eastern Kentucky	7	–	9	.438	16	–	16	.500
*SIU Edwardsville	6	–	10	.375	10	–	17	.370
Eastern Illinois	5	–	11	.313	12	–	17	.414
UT Martin	0	–	16	.000	4	–	27	.129
† 2012 Ohio Valley Conference tournament winner As of March 15, 2012; Rankings from AP Poll * Ineligible for conference tournament

The 2011–12 Murray State Racers men's basketball team represented Murray State University during the 2011–12 NCAA Division I men's basketball season. The Racers, led by first year head coach Steve Prohm, played their home games at the CFSB Center and were members of the Ohio Valley Conference. They were the Ohio Valley regular season champions and champions of the 2012 OVC Basketball tournament to earn the conference's automatic bid into the 2012 NCAA tournament. This was the Racers 15th tournament appearance. They defeated Colorado State in the second round before falling to Marquette in the third round to finish the season 31–2.

== Roster ==
2011–12 Murray State Racers men's basketball team
Players
Coaches

Pos.	#	Name	Height	Weight	Year	Previous school	Hometown
F	1	Stacy Wilson	6 ft 3 in (1.91 m)	185 lb (84 kg)	Jr	Mullins; Coffeyville CC	Mullins, SC
F	2	Ed Daniel	6 ft 7 in (2.01 m)	215 lb (98 kg)	Jr	Woodlawn	Birmingham, AL
G	3	Isaiah Canaan	6 ft 0 in (1.83 m)	193 lb (88 kg)	Jr	Biloxi	Biloxi, MS
G	5	Latreze Mushatt	6 ft 5 in (1.96 m)	210 lb (95 kg)	Jr	Arthur Hill; UMKC	Saginaw, MI
G	10	Zay Jackson	6 ft 0 in (1.83 m)	175 lb (79 kg)	Fr	St. Thomas Aquinas	Hammond, LA
F	11	Donte Poole	6 ft 3 in (1.91 m)	190 lb (86 kg)	Sr	Mojave	Las Vegas, NV
F	13	Brandon Garrett	6 ft 9 in (2.06 m)	200 lb (91 kg)	Jr	Paradise Valley; Indian Hills CC	Phoenix, AZ
G	14	Jordan Burge	5 ft 11 in (1.8 m)	162 lb (73 kg)	Jr	Northside Baptist	Mayfield, KY
G	23	Dexter Fields (redshirt)	6 ft 2 in (1.88 m)	190 lb (86 kg)	RS Jr	Olympia; UAB	Orlando, FL
G	32	Jaylen Bland	6 ft 3 in (1.91 m)	202 lb (92 kg)	Fr	Cleveland	Reseda, CA
G	33	Jewuan Long	6 ft 1 in (1.85 m)	175 lb (79 kg)	RS Sr	Liberty Tech	Jackson, TN
C	34	Harley Nussman	6 ft 10 in (2.08 m)	228 lb (103 kg)	Fr	Pearland	Pearland, TX
F	42	Ivan Aska	6 ft 7 in (2.01 m)	230 lb (104 kg)	Sr	Boyd H. Anderson	Fort Lauderdale, FL

Head coach

- Steve Prohm (Alabama)

Assistant coach(es)

- William Small (Belhaven)
- Matt McMahon (Appalachian State)
- James Kane (Florida)

Legend

- (C) Team captain
- (S) Suspended
- (I) Ineligible
- (W) Walk-on
- Injured
- Current redshirt

Roster

- Dexter Fields was ineligible this season under NCAA rules as a transfer. After this season, he had two years of eligibility remaining

== Schedule ==
Date time, TV	Rank^{#}	Opponent^{#}	Result	Record	Site (attendance) city, state
Exhibition
11/08/2011*; 7:00 pm		Bethel	W 77–32		CFSB Center; Murray, KY
Regular season
11/11/2011*; 7:45 pm		Harris–Stowe	W 76–49	1–0	CFSB Center (2,440); Murray, KY
11/14/2011*; 6:00 pm		at Morgan State	W 80–69	2–0	Talmadge L. Hill Field House (2,738); Baltimore, MD
11/17/2011*; 7:30 pm		Tennessee Temple	W 83–41	3–0	CFSB Center (2,308); Murray, KY
11/20/2011*; 3:00 pm		at UAB	W 62–55	4–0	Bartow Arena (3,863); Birmingham, AL
11/23/2011*; 9:30 pm		at Alaska Anchorage; Great Alaska Shootout first round	W 64–62	5–0	Sullivan Arena (4,586); Anchorage, AK
11/25/2011*; 8:30 pm		vs. San Francisco; Great Alaska Shootout semifinals	W 70–67	6–0	Sullivan Arena (4,661); Anchorage, AK
11/26/2011*; 11:00 pm		vs. Southern Miss; Great Alaska Shootout finals	W 90–81 ^{2OT}	7–0	Sullivan Arena (5,057); Anchorage, AK
12/01/2011*; 7:00 pm		at WKU	W 70–59	8–0	E. A. Diddle Arena (3,845); Bowling Green, Kentucky
12/04/2011*; 1:00 pm, FS Ohio		Dayton	W 75–58	9–0	CFSB Center (3,857); Murray, KY
12/11/2011*; 5:00 pm, CSS		at No. 21 Memphis	W 76–72	10–0	FedExForum (16,795); Memphis, TN
12/15/2011*; 7:00 pm	No. 24	Lipscomb	W 89–65	11–0	CFSB Center (3,993); Murray, KY
12/17/2011*; 7:00 pm	No. 24	Arkansas State	W 66–53	12–0	CFSB Center (4,031); Murray, KY
12/21/2011; 7:00 pm	No. 22	UT Martin	W 78–54	13–0 (1–0)	CFSB Center (5,877); Murray, KY
12/30/2012; 7:00 pm	No. 20	at Eastern Illinois	W 73–40	14–0 (2–0)	Lantz Arena (2,612); Charleston, IL
01/04/2012; 7:00 pm	No. 18	Eastern Kentucky	W 76–67	15–0 (3–0)	CFSB Center (5,852); Murray, KY
01/07/2012; 7:00 pm, ESPNU	No. 18	at Austin Peay	W 87–75	16–0 (4–0)	Dunn Center (5,503); Clarksville, TN
01/12/2012; 7:00 pm	No. 14	Jacksonville State	W 66–55	17–0 (5–0)	CFSB Center (5,839); Murray, KY
01/14/2012; 5:00 pm, ESPNU	No. 14	Tennessee Tech	W 82–74	18–0 (6–0)	CFSB Center (8,691); Murray, KY
01/18/2012; 6:00 pm, ESPN3	No. 12	at Morehead State	W 66–60	19–0 (7–0)	Ellis Johnson Arena (6,036); Morehead, KY
01/21/2012; 8:00 pm, ESPNU	No. 12	at SIU Edwardsville	W 82–65	20–0 (8–0)	Vadalabene Center (4,157); Edwardsville, IL
01/28/2012; 7:00 pm, ESPN3	No. 11	Eastern Illinois	W 73–58	21–0 (9–0)	CFSB Center (8,673); Murray, KY
02/02/2012; 7:00 pm, ESPNU	No. 10	Southeast Missouri State	W 81–73	22–0 (10–0)	CFSB Center (8,369); Murray, KY
02/04/2012; 6:00 pm	No. 10	at UT Martin	W 65–58	23–0 (11–0)	Skyhawk Arena (4,700); Martin, TN
02/09/2012; 7:00 pm, ESPN3	No. 9	Tennessee State	L 68–72	23–1 (11–1)	CFSB Center (8,668); Murray, KY
02/11/2012; 7:30 pm, ESPN3	No. 9	Austin Peay	W 82–63	24–1 (12–1)	CFSB Center (8,587); Murray, KY
02/15/2012; 7:00 pm	No. 16	at Southeast Missouri State	W 75–66	25–1 (13–1)	Show Me Center (7,125); Cape Girardeau, MO
02/18/2012*; 5:00 pm, ESPN	No. 16	No. 21 Saint Mary's; ESPN BracketBusters	W 65–51	26–1	CFSB Center (8,825); Murray, KY
02/23/2012; 7:30 pm, ESPNU	No. 14	at Tennessee State	W 80–62	27–1 (14–1)	Gentry Complex (10,125); Nashville, TN
02/25/2012; 7:30 pm	No. 14	at Tennessee Tech	W 69–64	28–1 (15–1)	Eblen Center (9,021); Cookeville, TN
2012 OVC Basketball tournament
03/02/2012; 6:00 pm, ESPNU	(1) No. 12	vs. (4) Tennessee Tech; Semifinals	W 78–58	29–1	Nashville Municipal Auditorium (5,142); Nashville, TN
03/03/2012; 1:00 pm, ESPN2	(1) No. 12	vs. (2) Tennessee State; Championship Game	W 54–52	30–1	Nashville Municipal Auditorium (6,454); Nashville, TN
2012 NCAA tournament
03/15/2012*; 11:15 am, CBS	(6 W) No. 12	vs. (11 W) Colorado State; First Round	W 58–41	31–1	KFC Yum! Center (16,069); Louisville, KY
03/17/2012*; 4:15 pm, CBS	(6 W) No. 12	vs. (3 W) No. 11 Marquette; Second Round	L 53–62	31–2	KFC Yum! Center (21,757); Louisville, KY
*Non-conference game. ^{#}Rankings from AP Poll. (#) Tournament seedings in parentheses. All times are in Central Time (#) Number seeded with region..

== Rankings ==
Ranking movement Legend: ██ Improvement in ranking. ██ Decrease in ranking.
Poll	Pre	Wk 1	Wk 2	Wk 3	Wk 4	Wk 5	Wk 6	Wk 7	Wk 8	Wk 9	Wk 10	Wk 11	Wk 12	Wk 13	Wk 14	Wk 15	Wk 16	WK 17	Wk 18	Final
AP	NR	NR	NR	NR	NR	24	22	20	19	15	12	11	10	9	16	14	12	11	12	
Coaches	NR	NR	NR	NR	NR	NR	22	21	18	14	10	9	9	7	14	12	9	10	9	
