= 2012 Ohio Valley Conference men's basketball tournament =

- Classification: Division I
- Season: 2011–12
- Teams: 8
- Site: Nashville Municipal Auditorium; Nashville, Tennessee
- Champions: Murray State (15th title)
- Winning coach: Steve Prohm (1st title)
- MVP: Donte Poole (Murray State)
- Television: ESPN3, ESPNU, ESPN2

2011–12 Ohio Valley Conference men's basketball standings
	Conf.				Overall
Team	W		L	PCT	W		L	PCT
No. 12 Murray State †	15	–	1	.938	31	–	2	.939
Tennessee State	11	–	5	.688	20	–	13	.606
Morehead State	10	–	6	.625	18	–	15	.545
Tennessee Tech	9	–	7	.563	19	–	14	.576
Southeast Missouri State	9	–	7	.563	15	–	16	.484
Austin Peay	8	–	8	.500	12	–	20	.375
Jacksonville State	8	–	8	.500	15	–	18	.455
Eastern Kentucky	7	–	9	.438	16	–	16	.500
*SIU Edwardsville	6	–	10	.375	10	–	17	.370
Eastern Illinois	5	–	11	.313	12	–	17	.414
UT Martin	0	–	16	.000	4	–	27	.129
† 2012 Ohio Valley Conference tournament winner As of March 15, 2012; Rankings from AP Poll * Ineligible for conference tournament

The 2012 Ohio Valley Conference men's basketball tournament began on February 29 and ended on March 3 with Murray State claiming the conference's automatic bid to the NCAA tournament. All games were held at Nashville Municipal Auditorium in Nashville, Tennessee.

== Format ==
The format for the tournament was changed, beginning with the 2011 tournament. Seeding changed to a merit-based system where the No. 1 and 2 seeds received a double bye to the semifinals while the No. 3 and 4 seeds earned a single bye to the quarterfinals. The first round matched the No. 5/8 and No. 6/7 seeds The top eight eligible men's basketball teams in the Ohio Valley Conference received berths in the conference tournament. After the 16-game conference season, teams were seeded by conference record. The winner earned an automatic berth in the 2012 NCAA tournament.

SIU Edwardsville was ineligible for the conference tournament, due to its transition to Division I.

== Seeds ==
The top eight qualified for the tournament. Teams were seeded by record within the conference, with a tiebreaker system to seed teams with identical conference records.

Seed	School	Conf (Overall)	Tiebreaker
#1	Murray State	15–1 (28–1)	
#2	Tennessee State	11–5 (19–11)	
#3	Morehead State	10–6 (18–14)	
#4	Tennessee Tech	9–7 (19–12)	1–0 vs SEMO
#5	SE Missouri State	9–7 (15–16)	0–1 vs TT
#6	Austin Peay	8–8 (12–20)	1–0 vs JSU
#7	Jacksonville State	8–8 (15–18)	0–1 vs AP
#8	Eastern Kentucky	7–9 (16–16)	

== Bracket ==
First round Wednesday, February 29
5	Southeast Missouri State	75
8	Eastern Kentucky	65
6	Austin Peay	70
7	Jacksonville State	75

Quarterfinals; Thursday, March 1
5	Southeast Missouri State	73
4	Tennessee Tech	77
7	Jacksonville State	54
3	Morehead State	68

Semifinals; Friday, March 2
4	Tennessee Tech	58
1	#12 Murray State	78
3	Morehead State	52
2	Tennessee State	59

Championship Game; Saturday, March 3
1	#12 Murray State	54
2	Tennessee State	52
