= 2011–12 Tennessee State Tigers basketball team =

American college basketball season

2011–12 Tennessee State Tigers men's basketball

CIT, First Round
- Conference: Ohio Valley Conference
- Record: 20–13 (11–5 OVC)
- Head coach: John Cooper (3rd season)
- Assistant coaches: Travis Williams; Rick Duckett; Sheldon Everett
- Home arena: Gentry Complex

2011–12 Ohio Valley Conference men's basketball standings
	Conf.				Overall
Team	W		L	PCT	W		L	PCT
No. 12 Murray State †	15	–	1	.938	31	–	2	.939
Tennessee State	11	–	5	.688	20	–	13	.606
Morehead State	10	–	6	.625	18	–	15	.545
Tennessee Tech	9	–	7	.563	19	–	14	.576
Southeast Missouri State	9	–	7	.563	15	–	16	.484
Austin Peay	8	–	8	.500	12	–	20	.375
Jacksonville State	8	–	8	.500	15	–	18	.455
Eastern Kentucky	7	–	9	.438	16	–	16	.500
*SIU Edwardsville	6	–	10	.375	10	–	17	.370
Eastern Illinois	5	–	11	.313	12	–	17	.414
UT Martin	0	–	16	.000	4	–	27	.129
† 2012 Ohio Valley Conference tournament winner As of March 15, 2012; Rankings from AP Poll * Ineligible for conference tournament

The 2011–12 Tennessee State Tigers basketball team represented Tennessee State University during the 2011–12 NCAA Division I men's basketball season. The Tigers, led by third year head coach John Cooper, played their home games at the Gentry Complex and are members of the Ohio Valley Conference. They finished the season 20–13, 11–5 in OVC play to finish in second place. They lost in the championship game of the Ohio Valley Basketball tournament to Murray State. They were invited to the 2012 CollegeInsider.com Tournament where they lost in the first round to Mercer.

== Roster ==
Number	Name	Position	Height	Weight	Year	Hometown
1	DeShawn Dockery	Guard	5–10	160	Junior	Chicago, Illinois
2	Patrick Miller	Guard	6–0	189	Sophomore	Chicago, Illinois
3	Kharon Butcher	Guard	6–2	173	Freshman	Atlanta, Georgia
5	Jay Harris	Guard	5–10	156	Freshman	Philadelphia, Pennsylvania
10	Wil Peters	Guard	6–1	175	Senior	Nashville, Tennessee
12	Muniru Bawa	Center	6–11	237	Sophomore	Tumu, Ghana
20	Chris Conner	Forward	6–4	229	Junior	Powell, Tennessee
21	Kellen Thornton	Forward	6–7	243	Junior	Chicago, Illinois
22	Tashan Fredrick	Guard	6–4	204	Junior	Hemingway, South Carolina
24	Taylor Ward	Guard	6–4	151	Freshman	White House, Tennessee
31	Kenny Moore	Forward	6–7	236	Senior	Philadelphia, Pennsylvania
33	Robert Covington	Forward	6–9	204	Junior	Bellwood, Illinois
34	M. J. Rhett	Forward	6–8	232	Freshman	Hopkins, South Carolina
44	Michael Green	Forward	6–9	192	Sophomore	Columbia, South Carolina
45	Jordan Cyphers	Guard	6–4	179	Junior	Wichita, Kansas

== Schedule ==
Date time, TV	Rank^{#}	Opponent^{#}	Result	Record	Site (attendance) city, state
Exhibition
11/01/2011*; 7:30 pm		Trevecca Nazarene	W 90–52		Gentry Complex; Nashville, TN
Regular season
11/11/2011*; 8:00 pm		at Saint Louis	L 37–71	0–1	Chaifetz Arena (6,497); St. Louis, MO
11/14/2011*; 7:00 pm		at WKU	L 49–52	0–2	E. A. Diddle Arena (3,372); Bowling Green, KY
11/16/2011*; 7:00 pm		Fisk	W 81–57	1–2	Gentry Complex (7,548); Nashville, TN
11/20/2011*; 5:00 pm, SportSouth		at South Carolina; Las Vegas Invitational	W 64–63	2–2	Colonial Life Arena (9,045); Columbia, SC
11/22/2011*; 6:30 pm, ESPN3		at No. 1 North Carolina; Las Vegas Invitational	L 69–102	2–3	Dean E. Smith Center (17,509); Chapel Hill, NC
11/25/2011*; 1:30 pm		vs. Mississippi Valley State; Las Vegas Invitational	L 89–90 ^{2OT}	2–4	Orleans Arena (7,200); Paradise, NV
11/26/2011*; 1:30 pm		vs. Morgan State; Las Vegas Invitational	W 69–64	3–4	Orleans Arena (NA); Las Vegas, NV
12/01/2011*; 7:00 pm		Middle Tennessee	L 62–77	3–5	Gentry Complex (6,131); Nashville, TN
12/06/2011*; 7:00 pm		at Belmont	L 62–75	3–6	Curb Event Center (1,403); Nashville, TN
12/10/2011*; 2:00 pm		Central Michigan	W 65–57	4–6	Gentry Complex (1,986); Nashville, TN
12/17/2011*; 6:00 pm		at Delaware State	W 59–55	5–6	Memorial Hall (207); Dover, DE
12/19/2011*; 7:00 pm		LeMoyne–Owen	W 92–55	6–6	Gentry Complex (827); Nashville, TN
12/21/2011*; 7:00 pm		Alabama A&M	W 78–68	7–6	Gentry Complex (1,022); Nashville, TN
12/29/2011; 7:30 pm		UT Martin	W 83–67	8–6 (1–0)	Gentry Complex (1,137); Nashville, TN
12/31/2011; 1:00 pm		at Eastern Kentucky	L 68–73	8–7 (1–1)	Alumni Coliseum (1,050); Richmond, KY
01/05/2012; 7:00 pm		at Tennessee Tech	L 86–92	8–8 (1–2)	Eblen Center (1,123); Cookeville, TN
01/07/2012; 4:30 pm		at Jacksonville State	L 65–72	8–9 (1–3)	Pete Mathews Coliseum (655); Jacksonville, AL
01/11/2012; 7:00 pm		Morehead State	W 77–72	9–9 (2–3)	Gentry Complex (1,306); Nashville, TN
01/14/2012; 7:30 pm		SIU Edwardsville	W 52–49	10–9 (3–3)	Gentry Complex (3,952); Nashville, TN
01/16/2012; 7:30 pm		at Austin Peay	L 63–69	10–10 (3–4)	Dunn Center (2,345); Clarksville, TN
01/19/2012; 7:00 pm		at Eastern Illinois	W 55–46	11–10 (4–4)	Lantz Arena (2,032); Charleston, IL
01/26/2012; 7:00 pm		at UT Martin	W 72–59	12–10 (5–4)	Skyhawk Arena (1,091); Martin, TN
01/28/2012; 7:00 pm		Eastern Kentucky	W 91–85 ^{2OT}	13–10 (6–4)	Gentry Complex (1,631); Nashville, TN
01/30/2012; 7:00 pm		Austin Peay	W 77–57	14–10 (7–4)	Gentry Complex (2,019); Nashville, TN
02/04/2012; 7:30 pm		at Southeast Missouri State	W 75–72	15–10 (8–4)	Show Me Center (3,500); Cape Girardeau, MO
02/09/2012; 7:00 pm, ESPN3		at No. 9 Murray State	W 72–68	16–10 (9–4)	CFSB Center (8,668); Murray, KY
02/11/2012; 7:30 pm		Tennessee Tech	W 68–53	17–10 (10–4)	Gentry Complex (3,650); Nashville, TN
02/14/2012; 7:00 pm		Jacksonville State	W 69–64 ^{OT}	18–10 (11–4)	Gentry Complex (2,065); Nashville, TN
02/19/2012*; 2:00 pm		at Miami (OH); ESPN BracketBusters	W 68–61	19–10	Millett Hall (1,724); Oxford, OH
02/23/2012; 7:00 pm, ESPNU		No. 14 Murray State	L 62–80	19–11 (11–5)	Gentry Complex (10,125); Nashville, TN
2012 OVC Basketball tournament
03/02/2012; 8:00 pm, ESPNU		vs. Morehead State; Semifinals	W 59–52	20–11	Nashville Municipal Auditorium (5,142); Nashville, TN
03/03/2012; 7:00 pm, ESPN2		vs. No. 12 Murray State; Championship Game	L 52–54	20–12	Nashville Municipal Auditorium (6,454); Nashville, TN
2012 CIT
03/13/2012*; 6:00 pm		at Mercer; First Round	L 60–68	20–13	University Center (1,773); Macon, GA
*Non-conference game. ^{#}Rankings from AP Poll. (#) Tournament seedings in parentheses. All times are in Central Time.
