= 2011–12 SIU Edwardsville Cougars men's basketball team =

American college basketball season

2011–12 SIU Edwardsville Cougars men's basketball
- Conference: Ohio Valley Conference
- West Division
- Record: 10–17 (6–10 OVC)
- Head coach: Lennox Forrester (5th season)
- Assistant coaches: Matt Laur; Kris Crosby; Deryl Cunningham
- Home arena: Vadalabene Center

2011–12 Ohio Valley Conference men's basketball standings
	Conf.				Overall
Team	W		L	PCT	W		L	PCT
No. 12 Murray State †	15	–	1	.938	31	–	2	.939
Tennessee State	11	–	5	.688	20	–	13	.606
Morehead State	10	–	6	.625	18	–	15	.545
Tennessee Tech	9	–	7	.563	19	–	14	.576
Southeast Missouri State	9	–	7	.563	15	–	16	.484
Austin Peay	8	–	8	.500	12	–	20	.375
Jacksonville State	8	–	8	.500	15	–	18	.455
Eastern Kentucky	7	–	9	.438	16	–	16	.500
*SIU Edwardsville	6	–	10	.375	10	–	17	.370
Eastern Illinois	5	–	11	.313	12	–	17	.414
UT Martin	0	–	16	.000	4	–	27	.129
† 2012 Ohio Valley Conference tournament winner As of March 15, 2012; Rankings from AP Poll * Ineligible for conference tournament

The 2011–12 SIU Edwardsville Cougars men's basketball team represented Southern Illinois University Edwardsville during the 2011–12 NCAA Division I men's basketball season. The Cougars, led by fifth-year head coach Lennox Forrester, played their home games at the Vadalabene Center and competed for the first time as members of the Ohio Valley Conference.

== Preseason ==
Six players returned from the 8–21 team of 2010–11. They were joined by four freshmen and three junior college transfers.

The OVC's pre-season coaches' poll picked SIUE to finish last in the Cougars' first season competing for the regular season title in the eleven team conference. No Cougars were selected to the pre-season All-OVC team.

== Season ==
After starting 0–4 in the Cancún Challenge, the Cougars won six conference games, including five of their last eight, and finished in ninth place. Had they been eligible, they still would have failed to qualify for the eight team Ohio Valley Conference tournament.

Mark Yelovich was named to the All-Ohio Valley Conference second team, and Jerome Jones was on the All-Newcomer team.

While earning no post-season honors, freshman Kris Davis was twice named OVC Freshman of the Week and led the NCAA Division I in three point shooting percentage.

== Roster ==
Source =

Number	Name	Position	Height	Weight	Year	Hometown	High School	Transfer from
1	Kris Davis	Guard	6–2	179	Freshman	Detroit	Detroit Cass Technical	
2	Maurice Wiltz †	Guard	6–2	175	Sophomore	Stafford, Texas	Stafford HS	Colorado State
4	Tim Johnson †	Guard	6–3	200	Junior	Lansing, Illinois	Lee Academy (ME)	George Washington
5	Corey Wickware	Guard	5–10	175	Senior	Indianapolis	Indianapolis Southport	Wabash Valley College
10	Reggie Reed	Guard	5–9	165	Junior	St. Petersburg, Florida	St. Petersburg Lakewood	Rend Lake College (JC)
13	Kevin Stineman	Guard	6	198	Senior	Buffalo Grove, Illinois	Stevenson	
14	Derian Shaffer	Forward	6–7	230	Junior	Detroit	Detroit Cass Technical	Kilgore College (JC)
15	Michael Birts	Forward	6–6	200	Freshman	Miami	Miami Robert Morgan	
22	Charles Joy	Forward	6–5	225	Freshman	O'Fallon, Illinois	O'Fallon Township High School	
23	David Boarden	Guard	6–4	204	Senior	Gary, Indiana	Merrillville Andrean	Detroit
24	Kyle Heck	Guard	6–2	188	Freshman	Metamora, Illinois	Metamora Township High School	
30	Michael Messer ††	Guard	6–5	208	Sophomore	Wildwood, Missouri	Lafayette High School	
33	Mark Yelovich	Forward	6–6	223	Junior	Mt. Zion, Illinois	Mount Zion High School	
34	Zeke Schneider	Forward/Center	6–9	225	Junior	Metamora, Illinois	Metamora Township High School	
35	Jerome Jones	Forward	6–6	215	Junior	St. Louis, Missouri	St.Louis Miller Career Academy	Indian Hills (JC)

† Sat out 2011–12 season due to NCAA Division I transfer rules
†† Sat out most of 2011–12 season as a medical redshirt

== Schedule ==
Source =

Date time, TV	Opponent	Result	Record	Site (attendance) city, state
Exhibition
11/3/2011*; 7:00 pm	Blackburn	W 70–56		Vadalabene Center (1,380); Edwardsville, Illinois
11/10/2011*; 7:00 pm	MacMurray	W 60–55		Vadalabene Center (1,201); Edwardsville, Illinois
Regular Season
11/14/2011*; 7:00 pm	at Illinois; Cancún Challenge	L 46–66	0–1	Assembly Hall (13,404); Champaign, Illinois
11/17/2011*; 7:00 pm	at Illinois State; Cancún Challenge	W 68-38	0–2	Redbird Arena (3,403); Normal, Illinois
11/22/2011*; 12:30	vs. Lipscomb; Cancún Challenge	L 87-90	0-3	Moon Palace Resort (210); Cancún, Mexico
11/23/2011*; 12:30	vs. Hampton; Cancún Challenge	L 64-68	0-4	Moon Palace Resort (435); Cancún, Mexico
11/30/2011*; 7:00	Robert Morris-Springfield	W 85-61	1-4	Vadalabene Center (1,324); Edwardsville, Il
12/3/2011*; 2:00	Cal State Fullerton	L 57-79	1-5	Vadalabene Center (1,145); Edwardsville, Illinois
12/3/2011*; 7:30, KPLR 11.2	Ball State	L 55-76	1-6	Vadalabene Center (1,708); Edwardsville, Illinois
12/6/2011*; 7:00	Hannibal-LaGrange	W 67-45	2-6	Vadalabene Center (1,125); Edwardsville, Illinois
12/19/2011*; 7:05, ESPN3	at SIU Carbondale	L 57-80	2-7	SIU Arena (3,108); Carbondale, Illinois
12/29/2011; 7:00, KPLR 11.2	Tennessee Tech	W 83-68	3-7	Vadalabene Center (1,049); Edwardsville, Illinois
12/31/2011; 3:30, KPLR 11	Jacksonville State	W 66-61	4-7	Vadalabene Center (2,007); Edwardsville, Illinois
1/4/2012; 7:00, KPLR 11.2	Eastern Illinois	L 59-73	4-8	Vadalabene Center (1,223); Edwardsville, Illinois
1/7/2012; 6:15	at UT Martin	W 69-65	5-8	Skyhawk Arena @ the Elam Center (1,661); Martin, Tennessee
1/12/2012; 7:00	at Southeast Missouri	L 68-85	5-9	Show Me Center (1,851); Cape Girardeau, Missouri
1/14/2012; 7:30	at Tennessee State	L 49-52	5-10	Gentry Center (3,952); Nashville, Tennessee
1/19/2012; 7:00, KPLR 11.2	Austin Peay	L 67-80	5-11	Vadalabene Center (1,390); Edwardsville, Illinois
1/21/2012; 8:05, ESPNU	No. 10 Murray State	W 82-65	5-12	Vadalabene Center (4,157); Edwardsville, Illinois
1/28/2012; 4:30	at Jacksonville State	L 65-76	5-13	Pete Mathews Coliseum (1,012); Jacksonville, Alabama
1/30/2012; 7:00	at Tennessee Tech	W 98-80	5-14	Eblen Center (1,503); Cookeville, Tennessee
2/2/2012; 7:00, KPLR 11.2	Morehead State	W 61-53	6-14	Vadalabene Center (1,158); Edwardsville, Illinois
2/4/2012; 7:00, KPLR 11.2	Eastern Kentucky	W 80-74	7-14	Vadalabene Center (1,464); Edwardsville, Illinois
2/11/2012; 7:00, KPLR 11	Southeast Missouri	W 85-72	7-15	Vadalabene Center (1,914); Edwardsville, Illinois
2/15/2012; 7:00	at Eastern Illinois	W 73-66	7-16	Lantz Arena (1,083); Charleston, Illinois
2/18/2012*; 1:00	Northern Illinois; ESPN/Sears BracketBusters	W 64-62	8-16	Vadalabene Center (1,458); Edwardsville, Illinois
2/23/2012; 7:49	at Eastern Kentucky	W 63-58	9-16	McBrayer Arena (1,900); Richmond, Kentucky
2/25/2012; 7:30	at Morehead State	L 61-76	9-17	Ellis Johnson Arena (3,226); Morehead, Kentucky
2/29/2012*; 7:05	at Chicago State	W 81-70	10-17	Jones Convocation Center (516); Chicago, Illinois
*Non-conference game. ^{#}Rankings from AP Poll. (#) Tournament seedings in parentheses. All times are in Central Time.
