= Steve Prohm =

American basketball coach (born 1974)

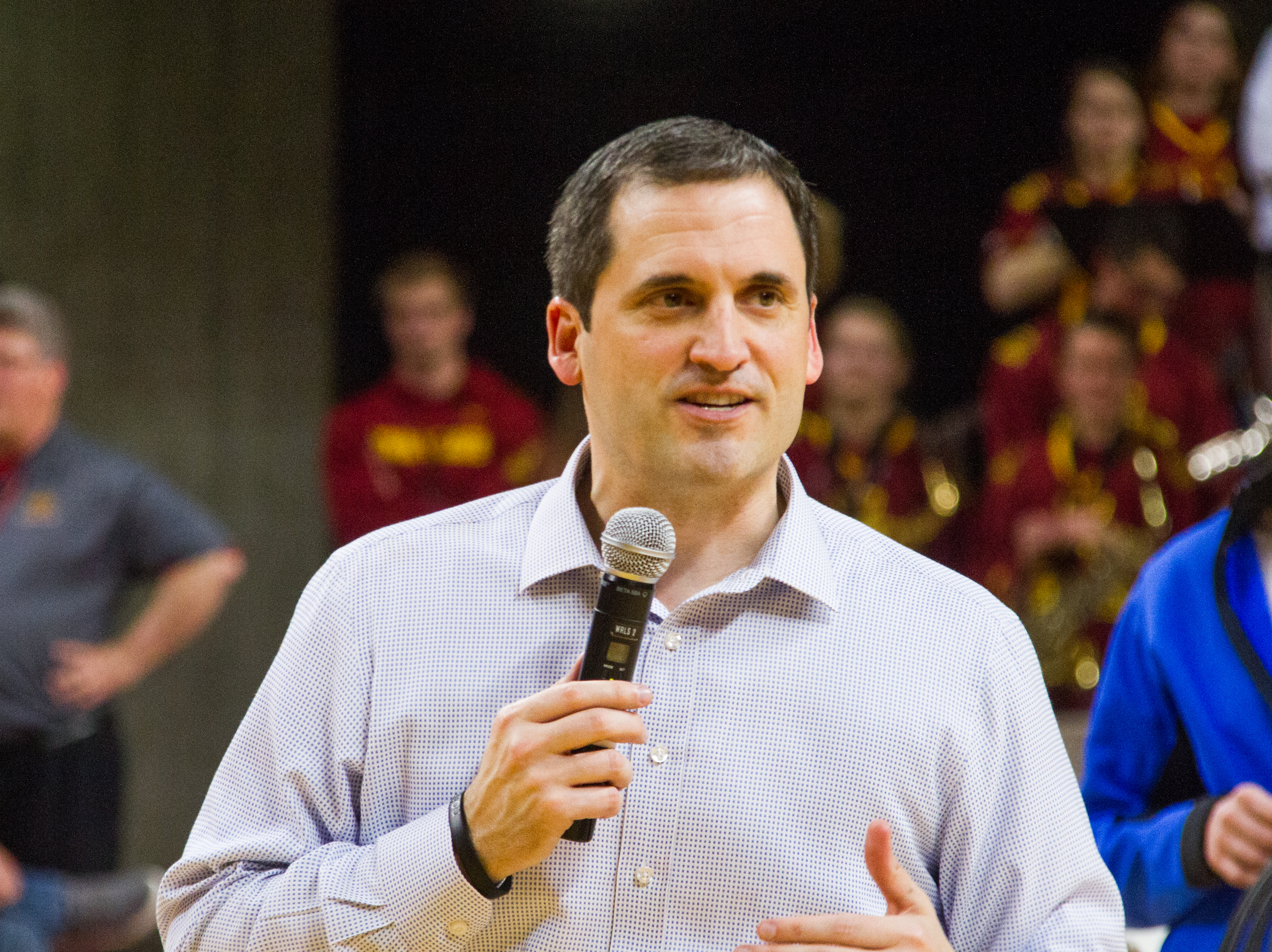

Biographical details
- Born: July 12, 1974 (age 52); Vienna, Virginia, U.S.
- Education: Alabama ('97)

Playing career
- 1992: Oglethorpe

Coaching career (HC unless noted)
- 1998–1999: Centenary (assistant)
- 1999–2005: Southeastern Louisiana (assistant)
- 2005–2006: Tulane (assistant)
- 2006–2011: Murray State (assistant)
- 2011–2015: Murray State
- 2015–2021: Iowa State
- 2022–2025: Murray State

Head coaching record
- Overall: 246–176 (.583)
- Tournaments: 4–3 (NCAA); 2–1 (NIT); 5–0 (CIT)

Accomplishments and honors

Championships
- CIT (2014); 2 OVC regular season (2012, 2015); OVC tournament (2012); 2 Big 12 tournament (2017, 2019)

Awards
- 2× OVC Coach of the Year (2012, 2015); Joe B. Hall Award (2012)

Steven Marshall Prohm (born July 12, 1974) is an American basketball coach who most recently served as the head coach at Murray State University from 2022 to 2025. Previously, he was the head coach at Iowa State University, a position he had held from 2015 to 2021. Prohm served in the same capacity at Murray State from 2011 to 2015.

== Early life ==
A native of Vienna, Virginia, Prohm's family later moved to Dalton, Georgia, where Prohm attended high school at Northwest Whitfield High School in Tunnel Hill, Georgia and lettered in basketball for three years, graduating in 1992.

He started college at Oglethorpe University in Atlanta where he played NCAA Division III basketball. Prohm made it less than halfway through his first season as a player when he left the team to follow his passion for coaching. After his first semester at Oglethorpe, Prohm transferred to the University of Alabama where he worked as a student assistant coach and student manager for the Crimson Tide men's basketball team for five years. He graduated from Alabama in 1997 with a degree in education.

== Coaching career ==
Prohm began his coaching career in 1998–99 as a volunteer assistant to Billy Kennedy at Centenary College, where he initially lived in the basement of a dorm and lived off cafeteria meals. He followed Kennedy to Southeastern Louisiana University, where he spent five seasons as an assistant before leaving for Tulane University. In 2006, he rejoined Kennedy's coaching staff, this time at Murray State University. Prohm played a key role in Murray State's resurgence under Kennedy, which culminated with a school-record 31 wins in 2009–10 and an upset of Vanderbilt in the 2010 NCAA tournament—only the second NCAA tournament win in school history.

=== Murray State ===
Prohm was named Murray State's 15th head coach on May 23, 2011, after Kennedy left for Texas A&M. In his first season, he led the Racers to their third straight Ohio Valley Conference regular-season title, a school record-tying 31 wins (including a school-best 23–0 start), a top-10 national ranking and an appearance in the NCAA Tournament.

=== Iowa State ===
On June 8, 2015, Iowa State University announced that Prohm would take over as head basketball coach replacing Fred Hoiberg, who left ISU to take the head coaching position with the Chicago Bulls. Prohm brought his lead recruiting assistant, William Small with him to the Cyclones.

In his first season with the Cyclones, he managed to secure a #4 seed in the Midwest region, where they defeated Iona and Little Rock to advance to the Sweet Sixteen, where they fell to top-seeded Virginia, 84–71.

During the first half of the 2016–17 season, the Cyclones struggled to meet preseason expectations, starting off with a record of 13–8. However, on February 4, 2017, they stunned third-ranked Kansas, 92–89, in overtime, snapping the Jayhawks' 54-game home winning streak. This proved to be a catalyst for turning their season around, as the Cyclones won six of their final eight games of the regular season, and went on to win the 2017 Big 12 men's basketball tournament with an 80–74 victory over West Virginia. They received a #5 seed in the Midwest region of the 2017 NCAA Division I men's basketball tournament and defeat #12 seed Nevada, 84–73, before falling to #4 seed Purdue in the second round, 80–76.

After a losing season in 2018, the Cyclones rebounded in 2019 with a Big 12 Tournament championship and an NCAA tournament appearance. But the Cyclones suffered back-to-back losing seasons in 2020 and 2021. The 2021 season was particularly brutal, as ISU, plagued by COVID-19 issues for a significant portion of the season, won only two games all year and went 0–18 in Big 12 play, the first team to go winless through Big 12 play since TCU in 2014. The season concluded with a loss to Oklahoma in the preliminary round of the Big 12 tournament. Afterward, ISU athletic director Jamie Pollard announced that Prohm and ISU had agreed to part ways. Prohm was succeeded at Iowa State by T. J. Otzelberger.

=== Return to Murray State ===
On March 25, 2022, Murray State announced that Prohm would return to the university as head coach following the departure of Matt McMahon to LSU. Prohm was terminated from his position on March 8, 2025, following his third straight 7th-place conference finish.

== Head coaching record ==
Record table
Season	Team	Overall	Conference	Standing	Postseason
Murray State Racers (Ohio Valley Conference) (2011–2015)
2011–12	Murray State	31–2	15–1	1st	NCAA Division I Round of 32
2012–13	Murray State	21–10	10–6	1st (West)	
2013–14	Murray State	23–11	13–3	1st (West)	CIT champion
2014–15	Murray State	29–6	16–0	1st (West)	NIT quarterfinal
Iowa State Cyclones (Big 12 Conference) (2015–2021)
2015–16	Iowa State	23–12	10–8	T–5th	NCAA Division I Sweet 16
2016–17	Iowa State	24–11	12–6	T–2nd	NCAA Division I Round of 32
2017–18	Iowa State	13–18	4–14	10th	
2018–19	Iowa State	23–12	9–9	5th	NCAA Division I Round of 64
2019–20	Iowa State	12–20	5–13	9th	
2020–21	Iowa State	2–22	0–18	10th	
Iowa State:		97–95 (.505)	40–68 (.370)		
Murray State Racers (Missouri Valley Conference) (2022–2025)
2022–23	Murray State	17–15	11–9	7th	
2023–24	Murray State	12–20	9–11	T–7th	
2024–25	Murray State	16–17	9–11	7th	
Murray State:		149–81 (.648)	84–41 (.672)		
Total:		246–176 (.583)			
National champion Postseason invitational champion Conference regular season champion Conference regular season and conference tournament champion Division regular season champion Division regular season and conference tournament champion Conference tournament champion
