= Zeke Moore (basketball) =

Trinidadian-American basketball player

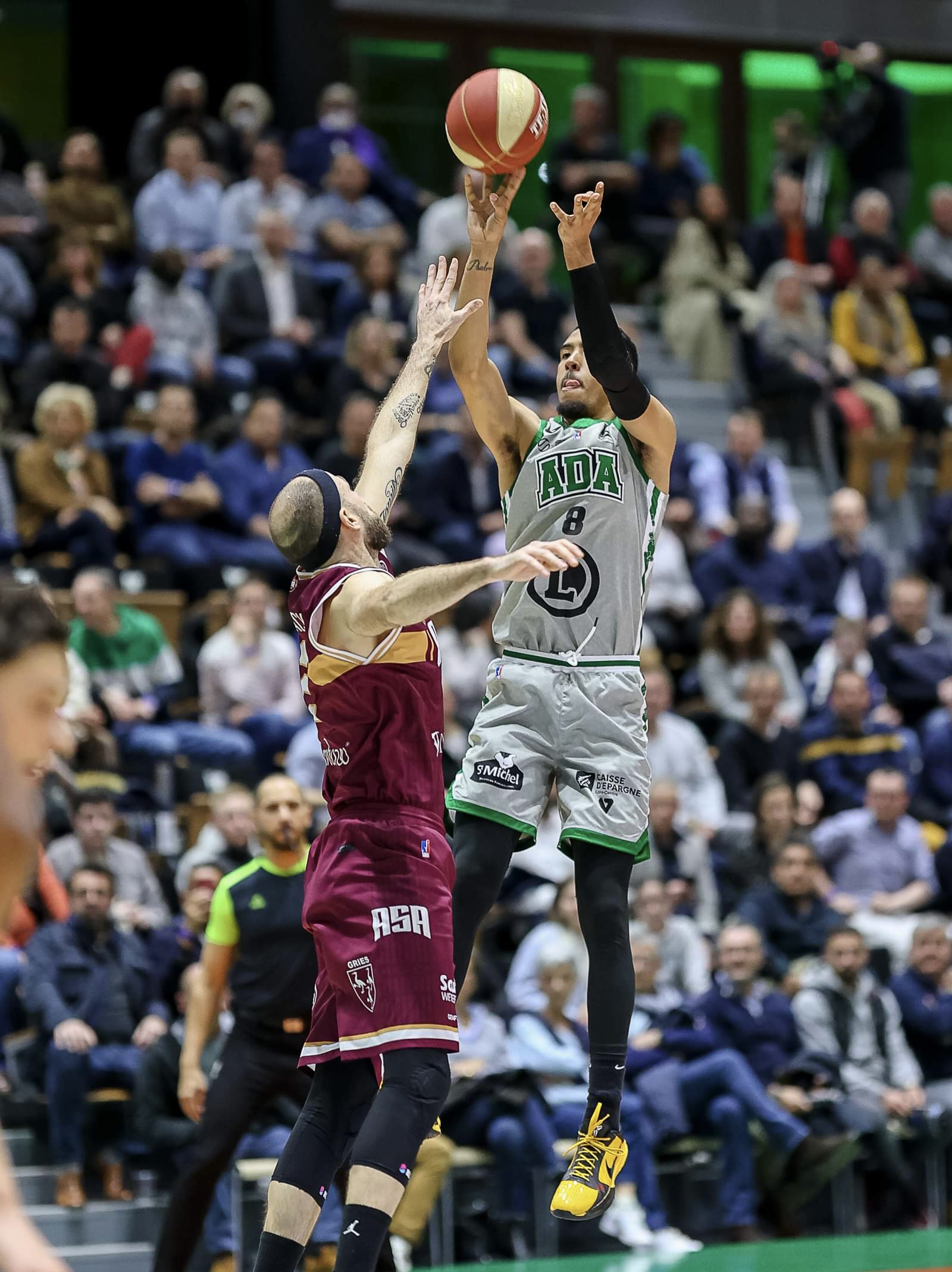
- Moore shooting over defender while playing for French Club ADA Blois 41 in 21–22 season

No. - – Boulazac Basket Dordogne
- Position: Shooting guard / point guard
- League: Betclic ÉLITE

Personal information
- Born: November 30, 1997 (age 28) Chicago, Illinois, U.S.
- Listed height: 6 ft 7 in (2.01 m)
- Listed weight: 205 lb (93 kg)

Career information
- High school: Riverview Gardens (St. Louis, Missouri)
- College: Saint Louis (2016–2017); Tulsa (2018–2019); SIU Edwardsville (2019–2020)
- NBA draft: 2020: undrafted
- Playing career: 2020–present

Career history
- 2020–2021: CB Pardinyes
- 2021–2022: Stevnsgade
- 2022: ADA Blois Basket 41
- 2022–2023: Santa Cruz Warriors
- 2023: Oklahoma City Blue
- 2023: Scarborough Shooting Stars
- 2024–2025: Hyères-Toulon
- 2025: Chorale Roanne
- 2025-2026: JDA Dijon
- 2026–present: Boulazac Basket Dordogne

Career highlights
- CEBL champion (2023); Basketligaen Scoring Champion (2022); Basketligaen Newcomer of year (2022); LNB Pro B champion (2022)

Ezekual Samuel James Moore (born November 30, 1997) is a Trinidadian-American professional basketball player for JDA Dijon of the LNB Pro A. He played college basketball for Saint Louis, Tulsa, and SIU Edwardsville.

== High school career ==
Moore attended Riverview Gardens Senior High School in Saint Louis, Missouri, where he played for his father, Gerard Moore. As a Junior in 2014–15, he ranked among the St. Louis area leading scorers, second behind Jayson Tatum, averaging 27.6 points and 4.3 assists per game while helping the Rams to an appearance in the Missouri Class 4A District finals, where they lost, the squad's deepest run since 2000. As a senior in 2015–16, Moore averaged 21.1 points, 4.9 rebounds and 4.4 assists per game and helped Riverview Gardens win its first district title since 1998. He then lead them to the state quarterfinal where they lost to eventual state champs Vashon High School. Moore ended up being a Third-team All-Metro selection by the St. Louis Post-Dispatch, Missouri Basketball Coaches Association, Class 4A First-team All-State pick, and graduated as Riverview Gardens' all-time leading varsity scorer with 1,395 career points.

== College career ==
As a freshman at Saint Louis in 2016–17, Moore played in 29 games, averaging 5.6 points, 2.0 rebounds and 1 assists in 20.8 minutes per game. Moore led the Billikens in 3 point Field Goals Made (80) and percentage (.39) on the season. Becoming the first Billiken freshman to lead his team in those categories since SLU joined the A-10 in 2005–06. He recorded 5 10-plus games as a freshman, scoring 10 points against BYU in Las Vegas, 12 points against Duquesne on January 11 and a career-high 12 points against Wichita State on December 6. On March 4, Moore tied his career-high against Richmond.

After his freshman year campaign came to an end, Moore asked to be released from his scholarship. He originally signed with Tennessee Tech but ended up at Southwestern Illinois College Months later he committed to play for head coach Frank Haith and the Tulsa Golden Hurricane. He scored a season high 11 points against New Orleans. Moore played in 14 games for Tulsa and averaged 2.6 points in 10.5 minutes per game. In January 2019, he announced he was transferring again to SIU Edwardsville. Moore averaged 12.6 points, 3.6 rebounds, and 1.5 assists per game. Following the season, he announced he was forgoing his final season of collegiate eligibility to turn professional.

=== College statistics ===
| Year | Team | GP | GS | MPG | FG% | 3P% | FT% | RPG | APG | SPG | BPG | PPG |
|---|---|---|---|---|---|---|---|---|---|---|---|---|
| 2016–17 | Saint Louis | 29 | 1 | 20.8 | .370 | .391 | .767 | 2.0 | 0.9 | 0.6 | 0.2 | 5.3 |
| 2018–19 | Tulsa | 14 | 4 | 10.5 | .378 | .235 | 1.000 | 1.4 | 0.4 | 0.2 | 0.1 | 2.6 |
| 2019–20 | SIU Edwardsville | 31 | 30 | 28.3 | .467 | .385 | .780 | 3.6 | 1.5 | 0.6 | 0.3 | 12.6 |

== Professional career ==
In August 2020, Moore signed a one-year contract with CB Pardinyes of the Spanish LEB Plata. In February 2021, Moore announced he was leaving the club for personal reasons. He subsequently joined Stevnsgade Basketball of the Danish league.

In April 2022, Moore was bought out of his contract from French Club ADA Blois Basket 41. His addition helped win the LNB B French championship.

=== Santa Cruz Warriors (2022–2023) ===
On October 24, 2022, Moore joined the Santa Cruz Warriors roster. On January 24, 2023, Moore was waived.

=== Oklahoma City Blue (2023) ===
On February 15, 2023, Moore signed with the Oklahoma City Blue.

=== Scarborough Shooting Stars (2023) ===
On June 9, 2023, Moore signed with the Scarborough Shooting Stars of the Canadian Elite Basketball League, making his debut that night.

=== HTV Basket (2024–2025) ===
On October 30, 2024, he signed with HTV Basket of the LNB Pro B.

=== Chorale de Roanne Basket (2025) ===
On February 25, 2025 Moore signed with Chorale Roanne Basket of the LNB Pro B.

=== JDA Dijon (2025–present) ===
On August 5, 2025, he signed with JDA Dijon of the LNB Pro A.

=== Professional statistics ===
| Year | Team | GP | GS | MPG | FG% | 3P% | FT% | RPG | APG | SPG | BPG | PPG |
|---|---|---|---|---|---|---|---|---|---|---|---|---|
| 2020–21 | CB Pardinyes | 16 | 15 | 26.4 | .496 | .327 | .874 | 4.6 | 2.1 | 1.1 | 0.8 | 17.5 |
| 2021–22 | Basketball Club Copenhagen | 20 | 19 | 30.1 | .456 | .312 | .81.7 | 6.4 | 3.9 | 2.0 | 0.6 | 20.2 |

== Personal life ==
Moore was born in Chicago, Illinois and raised in Granite City, Illinois. His parents are Gerard and Crystal Moore. He has 3 siblings in which he is the oldest. Two sisters, Addaya who currently plays basketball at the University of Cincinnati, and Azaria. He also has a brother Zidane who plays for Holbæk-stenhus. His father played basketball for Hall of fame Coach Lou Henson at New Mexico State University. Zeke graduated with a degree in education.
