= Jamie Pollard =

American athletic director

Biographical details
- Born: February 11, 1965 (age 61); Oshkosh, Wisconsin, U.S.
- Education: University of Wisconsin–Oshkosh

Playing career

Cross country Track and field
- 1983–1987: Wisconsin–Oshkosh Titans

Administrative career (AD unless noted)
- 1989–1994: Saint Louis (assoc. AD)
- 1994–1998: Maryland (assoc. AD)
- 1998–2003: Wisconsin (assoc. AD)
- 2003–2005: Wisconsin (deputy AD)
- 2005–2026: Iowa State

Accomplishments and honors

Championships
- NCAA Championship (1987)

Jamie Pollard (born February 11, 1965) is a former American athletic director who worked at Iowa State University. Before Iowa State, Pollard served in various capacities in intercollegiate athletics at Wisconsin, Maryland and Saint Louis.

== Early life ==
Pollard was born and raised in Oshkosh, Wisconsin, prior to attending University of Wisconsin–Oshkosh. At Wisconsin–Oshkosh he was a four year letter-winner in both cross country and track & field from 1983–1987. In cross country Pollard helped UW–Oshkosh to a fifth-place finish in 1983, a fourth-place finish in 1984, a second-place finish in 1985 and a fourth-place finish in 1986. In 1986 he had his best personal finish resulting in All-America status, a 24th-place finish at the NCAA Championship. In track & field his career culminated in an NCAA Championship in the 5,000 meter run in 1987.

== Career ==
=== Early career ===
Post graduation Pollard was a CPA at Arthur Andersen & Company in Milwaukee, Wisconsin, from 1987–1989. From there he transitioned into his first job in athletic administration becoming Associate AD for Internal Operations at Saint Louis University. At SLU he managed operations and oversaw balancing the budget for the athletic department. In 1994 he transitioned to a similar role at the University of Maryland. Then in 1998 Pollard became a Senior Associate AD for Administration and the CFO for the University of Wisconsin. In this role he oversaw all finances and fundraising efforts for the athletic department. In 2003 he was named to Sports Business Journal's Forty Under Forty List. In 2003 he was internally promoted to be the deputy athletic director to serve as the number two under Barry Alvarez.

=== Iowa State ===
On September 19, 2005 it was announced that Pollard was hired as the athletic director at Iowa State.

Some highlights of his tenure at ISU include hiring head coaches Fred Hoiberg, Steve Prohm, T. J. Otzelberger, and Matt Campbell. He has overseen investments of over $160 million on athletic facilities including Jack Trice Stadium.

On July 10, 2026, Pollard announced plans to retire, effective June 30, 2027, or when his successor is in place.

== Personal life ==
Jamie and his wife Ellen have four children: Thomas, Annie, Margaret and James. Thomas, a member of the Iowa State Cross Country team, was named the Big 12 Newcomer of the Year in 2017. Margaret, a member of the University of Nebraska – Lincoln Cross Country Team, was awarded the Sam Foltz 27 Hero Leadership Award in 2021.
