= 2011–12 Tennessee Tech Golden Eagles men's basketball team =

American college basketball season

2011–12 Tennessee Tech Golden Eagles men's basketball

CIT, First Round
- Conference: Ohio Valley Conference
- Record: 19–14 (9–7 OVC)
- Head coach: Steve Payne (1st season)
- Assistant coaches: Happy Osborne; Russ Willemsen; David Boyden
- Home arena: Eblen Center

2011–12 Ohio Valley Conference men's basketball standings
| | Conf. | | | | Overall |
| Team | W | | L | PCT | W | | L | PCT |
|---|---|---|---|---|---|---|---|---|
| No. 12 Murray State † | 15 | – | 1 | .938 | 31 | – | 2 | .939 |
| Tennessee State | 11 | – | 5 | .688 | 20 | – | 13 | .606 |
| Morehead State | 10 | – | 6 | .625 | 18 | – | 15 | .545 |
| Tennessee Tech | 9 | – | 7 | .563 | 19 | – | 14 | .576 |
| Southeast Missouri State | 9 | – | 7 | .563 | 15 | – | 16 | .484 |
| Austin Peay | 8 | – | 8 | .500 | 12 | – | 20 | .375 |
| Jacksonville State | 8 | – | 8 | .500 | 15 | – | 18 | .455 |
| Eastern Kentucky | 7 | – | 9 | .438 | 16 | – | 16 | .500 |
| *SIU Edwardsville | 6 | – | 10 | .375 | 10 | – | 17 | .370 |
| Eastern Illinois | 5 | – | 11 | .313 | 12 | – | 17 | .414 |
| UT Martin | 0 | – | 16 | .000 | 4 | – | 27 | .129 |
† 2012 Ohio Valley Conference tournament winner As of March 15, 2012; Rankings from AP Poll * Ineligible for conference tournament

The 2011–12 Tennessee Tech Golden Eagles men's basketball team represented Tennessee Technological University during the 2011–12 NCAA Division I men's basketball season. The Golden Eagles, led by first-year head coach Steve Payne, played their home games at the Eblen Center and are members of the Ohio Valley Conference. They finished the season 19–14, 9–7 in OVC play to finish in third place. They lost in the semifinals of the Ohio Valley Basketball tournament to Murray State. They were invited to the 2012 CollegeInsider.com Tournament, where they lost in the first round to Georgia State.

== Roster ==
| Number | Name | Position | Height | Weight | Year | Hometown |
|---|---|---|---|---|---|---|
| 00 | Liam Neeson | Center | 7–0 | 265 | Senior | Toronto, Ontario |
| 2 | Zac Swansey | Guard | 6–1 | 180 | Senior | Dunwoody, Georgia |
| 3 | Matt Damon | Forward | 6–6 | 205 | Junior | Brooklyn, New York |
| 5 | Javon McKay | Guard | 6–5 | 195 | Freshman | Atlanta, Georgia |
| 10 | Lanerryl Johnson | Guard | 6–0 | 175 | Freshman | Atlanta, Georgia |
| 11 | Terrell Barnes | Forward | 6–8 | 265 | Junior | Riverdale, Georgia |
| 12 | Mitchell Hill | Guard | 6–1 | 170 | Freshman | Cookeville, Tennessee |
| 15 | Riley Hunley | Guard | 6–3 | 185 | Senior | Knoxville, Tennessee |
| 20 | John Sexton | Guard | 6–3 | 200 | Junior | Memphis, Tennessee |
| 24 | Chase Dunn | Guard | 5–10 | 175 | Sophomore | Livingston, Tennessee |
| 25 | Jud Dillard | Guard | 6–5 | 190 | Junior | Riverdale, Georgia |
| 30 | Ryon Riggins | Forward | 6–9 | 210 | Freshman | Norcross, Georgia |
| 32 | Bassey Inameti | Forward | 6–8 | 215 | Senior | Suwanee, Georgia |
| 33 | Dennis Ogbe | Forward | 6–7 | 210 | Sophomore | Munich, Germany |
| 42 | Zach Bailey | Guard | 6–1 | 175 | Senior | Ft. Lauderdale, Florida |
| 55 | Kevin Murphy | Guard | 6–7 | 185 | Senior | Atlanta, Georgia |

== Schedule ==
| Date time, TV | Rank^{#} | Opponent^{#} | Result | Record | Site (attendance) city, state |
Regular season
| 11/11/2011*; 8:00 pm | | at Miami (FL) | L 58–69 | 0–1 | BankUnited Center (3,600); Coral Gables, FL |
| 11/15/2011*; 7:00 pm | | Reinhardt | W 94–64 | 1–1 | Eblen Center (1,094); Cookeville, TN |
| 11/19/2011*; 7:00 pm | | Appalachian State | L 63–68 | 1–2 | Eblen Center (1,650); Cookeville, TN |
| 11/22/2011*; 8:00 pm | | at High Point | W 62–57 | 2–2 | Millis Center (1,106); High Point, NC |
| 11/25/2011*; 7:00 pm | | Lamar | L 65–85 | 2–3 | Eblen Center (857); Cookeville, TN |
| 11/27/2011*; 4:00 pm | | vs. Wilberforce | W 84–83 | 3–3 | Eblen Center (629); Cookeville, TN |
| 12/03/2011*; 8:00 pm | | at Duquesne | L 67–77 | 3–4 | Palumbo Center (2,368); Pittsburgh, PA |
| 12/07/2011*; 7:30 pm | | East Tennessee State | W 83–74 | 4–4 | Eblen Center (1,455); Cookeville, TN |
| 12/10/2011*; 7:00 pm | | Lipscomb | W 89–87 ^{OT} | 5–4 | Eblen Center (1,168); Cookeville, TN |
| 12/17/2011*; 1:00 pm | | at Evansville | W 65–57 | 6–4 | Ford Center (4,235); Evansville, IN |
| 12/19/2011*; 8:00 pm, ESPN3 | | at West Virginia; Las Vegas Classic | L 53–72 | 6–5 | WVU Coliseum (6,252); Morgantown, WV |
| 12/22/2011*; 4:30 pm | | vs. Kennesaw State; Las Vegas Classic | W 81–68 | 7–5 | Orleans Arena (NA); Paradise, NV |
| 12/23/2011*; 4:30 pm | | vs. Bethune-Cookman; Las Vegas Classic | W 67–59 | 8–5 | Orleans Arena (NA); Las Vegas, NV |
| 12/29/2011; 7:00 pm | | at SIU Edwardsville | L 68–83 | 8–6 (0–1) | Vadalabene Center (1,049); Edwardsville, IL |
| 12/31/2011; 4:00 pm | | at UT Martin | W 85–62 | 9–6 (1–1) | Skyhawk Arena (1,113); Martin, TN |
| 01/05/2012; 7:00 pm | | Tennessee State | W 92–86 | 10–6 (2–1) | Eblen Center (1,123); Cookeville, TN |
| 01/07/2012; 7:30 pm | | Morehead State | W 66–55 | 11–6 (3–1) | Eblen Center (2,049); Cookeville, TN |
| 01/14/2012; 5:00 pm, ESPNU | | at No. 14 Murray State | W 77–72 | 11–7 (3–2) | CFSB Center (8,691); Murray, KY |
| 01/19/2012; 7:00 pm | | Jacksonville State | L 62–63 | 11–8 (3–3) | Eblen Center (2,424); Cookeville, TN |
| 01/21/2012; 7:30 pm | | Southeast Missouri State | W 77–62 | 12–8 (4–3) | Eblen Center (2,685); Cookeville, TN |
| 01/26/2012; 6:00 pm | | at Eastern Kentucky | W 82–65 | 13–8 (5–3) | Alumni Coliseum (2,400); Richmond, KY |
| 01/28/2012; 2:00 pm, ESPNU | | at Morehead State | L 50–56 | 13–9 (5–4) | Ellis Johnson Arena (2,833); Morehead, KY |
| 01/30/2012; 7:00 pm | | SIU Edwardsville | W 98–80 | 14–9 (6–4) | Eblen Center (1,503); Cookeville, TN |
| 02/02/2012; 7:00 pm | | at Austin Peay | W 94–88 | 15–9 (7–4) | Dunn Center (2,243); Clarksville, TN |
| 02/04/2012; 4:30 pm | | at Jacksonville State | W 76–68 | 16–9 (8–4) | Pete Mathews Coliseum (2,118); Jacksonville, AL |
| 02/09/2012; 7:00 pm | | Eastern Illinois | L 57–74 | 16–10 (8–5) | Eblen Center (1,425); Cookeville, TN |
| 02/11/2012; 7:30 pm | | at Tennessee State | L 53–68 | 16–11 (8–6) | Gentry Complex (3,650); Nashville, TN |
| 02/15/2012; 7:00 pm | | Eastern Kentucky | W 74–67 | 17–11 (9–6) | Eblen Center (1,003); Cookeville, TN |
| 02/18/2012*; 11:00 am | | at Coastal Carolina; ESPN BracketBusters | W 77–71 | 18–11 | Kimbel Arena (1,039); Conway, SC |
| 02/25/2012; 7:30 pm | | No. 14 Murray State | L 64–69 | 18–12 (9–7) | Eblen Center (9,021); Cookeville, TN |
2012 OVC Basketball tournament
| 03/01/2012; 6:00 pm | | vs. Southeast Missouri State; Quarterfinals | W 77–73 | 19–12 | Nashville Municipal Auditorium (1,621); Nashville, TN |
| 03/02/2012; 6:00 pm, ESPNU | | vs. No. 12 Murray State; Semifinals | L 52–54 | 19–13 | Nashville Municipal Auditorium (5,142); Nashville, TN |
2012 CIT
| 03/13/2012*; 7:00 pm | | at Georgia State; First Round | L 43–74 | 19–14 | GSU Sports Arena (1,509); Atlanta, GA |
*Non-conference game. ^{#}Rankings from AP Poll. (#) Tournament seedings in parentheses. All times are in Central Time.
