= 2011 Great Alaska Shootout =

American college basketball tournament

- Season: 2011–12
- Teams: 8 (men's), 4 (women's)
- Finals site: Sullivan Arena, Anchorage, Alaska
- Champions: Murray State (men's); Miami (FL)(women's)
- MVP: Isaiah Canaan, Murray State (men's); Shenise Johnson, Miami (FL) (women's)

The 2011 Great Alaska Shootout, was the 33rd Great Alaska Shootout competition, the annual college basketball tournament in Anchorage, Alaska that features colleges from all over the United States. The 2011 event was held from November 23, 2011, through November 26, 2011, with 8 colleges attending from Kentucky, Alaska, New Hampshire, California, Michigan, New Mexico, and Mississippi.

== Brackets ==
* – Denotes overtime period

=== Men's ===
5th Place Game; November 26
Dartmouth | 48
Central Michigan | 65
7th Place Game
Alaska Anchorage | 77
UC Irvine | 63

Consolation 2nd Round; November 25
Alaska Anchorage | 52
Dartmouth | 64
Central Michigan | 82
UC Irvine | 72

First Round; November 23, 24
Murray State | 64
Alaska Anchorage | 62
Dartmouth | 69
San Francisco | 71
Central Michigan | 49
New Mexico State | 78
UC Irvine | 67
Southern Miss | 78

Semifinals; November 25
Murray State | 70
San Francisco | 67
New Mexico State | 72
Southern Miss | 80

Championship; November 26
Murray State | 90**
Southern Miss | 81
3rd Place Game
San Francisco | 71
New Mexico State | 81

=== Women's ===
Semifinals; November 23
South Florida | 86
Central Michigan | 80*
Miami (FL) | 72
Alaska Anchorage | 55

Championship; November 24
South Florida | 72
Miami (FL) | 92
3rd Place game November 24
Central Michigan | 90*
Alaska Anchorage | 84
