= CFSB Center =

Arena in Kentucky, United States

- "The Bank"
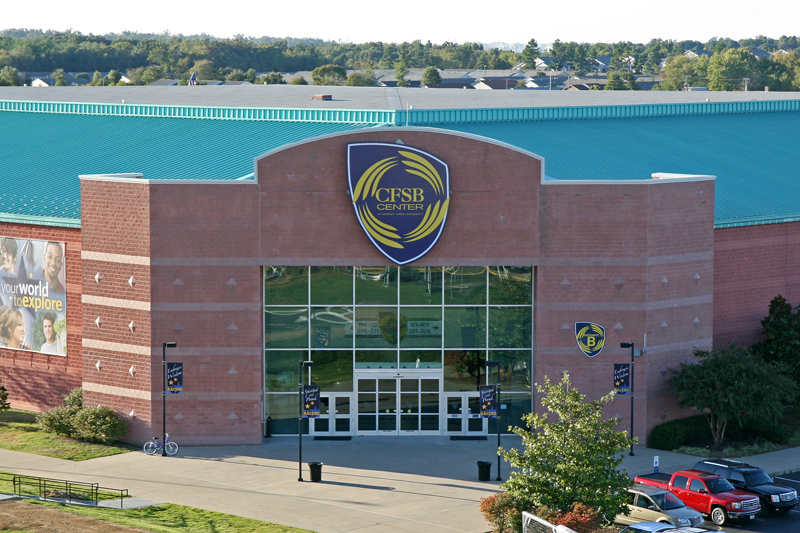
- Interactive map of CFSB Center
- Former names: Regional Special Events Center
- Location: 1401 State Route 121 North; Murray, KY 42071
- Coordinates: 36.62267°N 88.32031°W
- Owner: Murray State University
- Operator: Murray State University
- Capacity: 8,602 - Basketball; 7,800 - Concerts
- Surface: Multi-surface

Construction
- Groundbreaking: 1995
- Opened: September 12, 1998
- Cost: $23 million ($45.4 million in 2025 dollars)
- Architects: Peck, Flannery, Gream, Warren, Inc.
- General contractors: Bell & Associates Construction

Tenant
- Murray State Racers (1998–present)

The CFSB Center is an 8,600-seat arena located in Murray, Kentucky, near the intersection of Ky. 121 and U.S. 641. The arena is the home of the Murray State Racers Basketball teams. It was previously known as the Regional Special Events Center, or RSEC, until the name was changed on September 17, 2010, following a $3.3 million donation from Community Financial Services Bank to Murray State Athletics. While the CFSB Center is commonly used for basketball, it was designed as a multi-purpose facility that also frequently hosts concerts, trade shows, and conventions.

== History ==
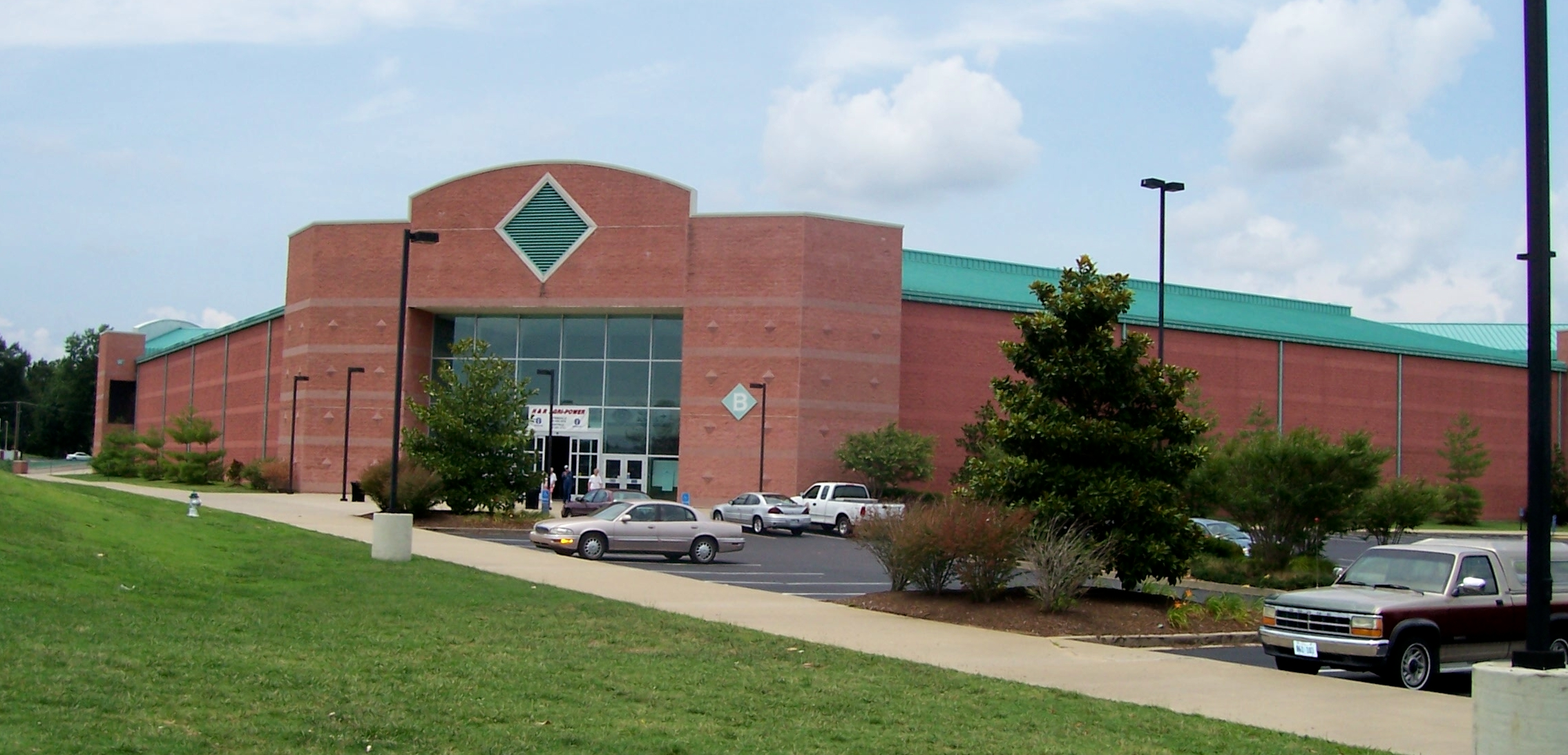
RSEC as it appeared before naming rights were sold to CFSB

The Regional Special Events Center (RSEC) was built as a replacement for Racer Arena, the school's former basketball arena. While Racer Arena was structurally sound (it still stands and is now used for volleyball), it was growing increasingly obsolete, and its capacity of 5,500 proved too small for the men's basketball program. Talk of a new basketball arena began around 1978, when the basketball program was beginning to make big strides toward success. The project became reality in the early 1990s when the Kentucky General Assembly appropriated $18 million for construction of the project on the condition that the school would raise at least $2 million locally. Ground was broken in 1995; however, construction problems and cost overruns delayed completion of the facility until 1998 and pushed the total cost to $23 million for the 188,800-square-foot (17,540 m^{2}) facility.

RSEC officially opened on September 12, 1998, but the first event was actually the Kentucky Baptist Youth Conference in June 1998, which took place before construction was completed. Tim McGraw played the first concert at the facility on September 26, 1998, to a crowd of about 8,000 people.

In 2004, new basketball locker rooms and a weight room were constructed in the Regional Special Events Center. Additional enhancements were implemented between August and September 2009, including a new playing floor and two wide screen video boards measuring 10 feet (3.0 m) tall and 18 feet (5.5 m) wide.

Community Financial Services Bank made a $3.3 million donation to Murray State athletics in September 2010 in exchange for naming rights to the Regional Special Events Center. The name of the facility officially changed to the CFSB Center on September 17, 2010. Following the donation, Murray State also unveiled plans in January 2011 for facility expansion and upgrades to the CFSB Center. Since the building was constructed as a multi-purpose facility, the other events held at the CFSB Center often restrict the amount of court time available to the Murray State basketball teams. The expansion plan calls for a new practice facility attached to the CFSB Center that will give both men's and women's basketball teams unlimited access to courts. In addition to new practice space, the expansion will include new office space for basketball coaches. The university also has plans to construct luxury boxes for the CFSB Center and relocate the MSU Athletics Hall of Fame to the CFSB Center.

Relocation of the MSU Athletics Hall of Fame to the CFSB Center was completed in Summer 2011, and Hastings & Chivetta was selected as the architect for construction of the new practice facility and coaching office space. Construction work on the facility expansion was originally expected to begin by November 2011; however, it was delayed until after the nationally televised final home game of the 2011-12 men's basketball season against the nationally ranked Saint Mary's Gaels. Preliminary ground work on the CFSB Center expansion finally began in late February 2012. Construction of the practice facility and office space will add more than 18,000 square feet (1,700 m^{2}) of additional space to the CFSB Center. The construction contract was awarded to Pinnacle, Inc. of Benton, Kentucky. The addition to the CFSB Center is scheduled to open in January 2013.

== Features ==
The CFSB Center uses a split-level concourse system, with the lower level section accessed through a lower level entrance (Quad A, Northeast Entrance just off Highway 121) and the upper level accessed through any entrance, primarily at the main entrance (Quad B, Southeast Entrance just off Gilbert Graves Drive).

Lower Level

The lower level is the main concourse and features street level access from two of the four gates located on Gilbert Graves and US Highway 121. This level accesses sections 101 to 121. It is on this level where the main ticket box offices are located. The lower level also features VIP concessions, locker rooms, the Murray Room (a banquet-style or meeting space for up to 200 people), and the administrative offices.

Upper Level

The Upper level accesses sections 201 through 222, as well as standing room and four concessions areas. Surrounding the upper level is a four lane rubberized track. The state-of-the-art rubberized floor provides a safe and comfortable indoor walking experience. The track is available to Murray State students, faculty and staff, as well as the local community. Just seven laps around the track is equal to one mile (1.6 km).

Main Box Office

The CFSB Center is a Ticketmaster facility. All tickets can be bought at the facility, or online.

Sports Medicine Room

This large area is dedicated solely to the care and health of MSU athletes. It includes two general offices and a doctor's office, as well as a whirlpool room.

Weight Room

This room is utilized by the men's and women's basketball teams for strength training. All athletes who utilize the weight room are in direct supervision of their trainer.

Officials Locker Rooms

These rooms not only serve as the place where officials will come to prepare for games, but also as production offices for concerts and other special events. Road managers and the production staff have online access in these rooms.

Loading Dock Area

Built for convenience and easy access, the loading dock area includes three bays that are large enough to drive three 18-wheelers through. It also offers show power and enough shore power for four buses.

== Basketball record crowds ==
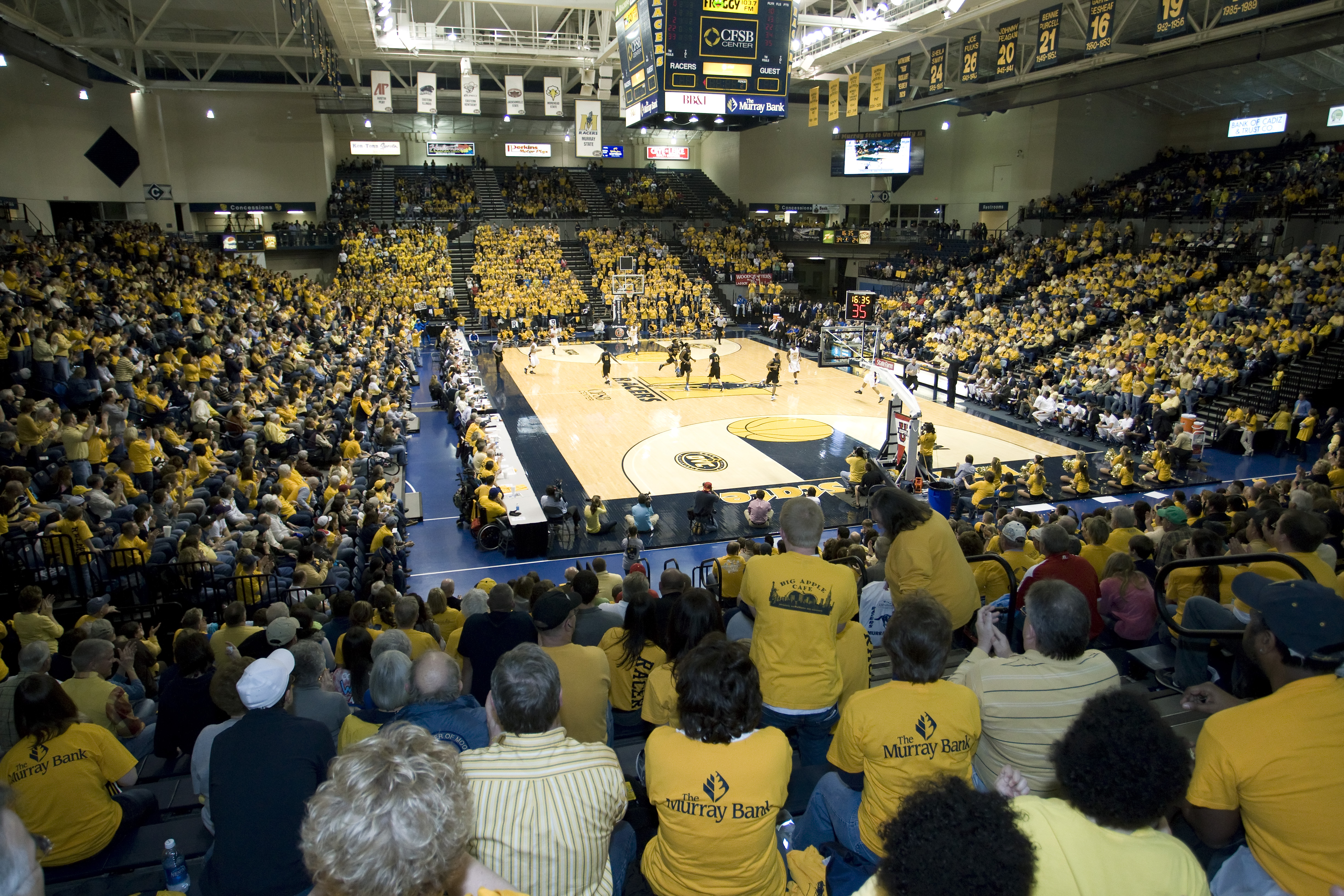
View of the crowd inside the CFSB Center during a February 26, 2011 basketball game

The CFSB Center is one of the loudest arenas in college basketball. During the February 18, 2012 game between the Racers and the Saint Mary's Gaels, peak noise levels of 138 dBA were measured in the CFSB Center. This is the highest documented noise level ever recorded at an indoor basketball arena.

#	Date	Opposition	Attendance	Score
1	March 2, 2019	Austin Peay	9,012	94-83 (Win)
2	January 24, 2019	Belmont	8,969	66-79 (Loss)
3	February 18, 2012	Saint Mary's	8,825	65-51 (Win)
4	January 14, 2012	Tennessee Tech	8,691	82-74 (Win)
5	January 28, 2012	Eastern Illinois	8,673	73-58 (Win)
6	February 9, 2012	Tennessee State	8,668	68-72 (Loss)
7	February 11, 1999	Southeast Missouri	8,602	62-52 (Win)
8	February 11, 2012	Austin Peay	8,587	82-63 (Win)
9	February 2, 2012	Southeast Missouri	8,369	81-73 (Win)
10	January 23, 1999	Austin Peay	8,352	89-58 (Win)
11	February 29, 2020	Austin Peay	8,229	75-61 (Win)
12	January 17, 2026	Indiana State	8,083	85-81 (Win)
13	February 24, 2022	Belmont	8,041	76-43 (Win)
14	February 9, 2019	SIU-Edwardsville	8,007	86-55 (Win)
15	February 23, 2019	Southeast Missouri	7,762	103-67 (Win)
16	November 11, 1998	Southern Illinois	7,633	65-62 (Win)
17	February 1, 2020	SIU-Edwardsville	7,512	74-55 (Win)
18	March 2, 2013	Southeast Missouri	7,489	68-84 (Loss)
19	December 7, 2002	Western Kentucky	7,288	83-72 (Win)
20	February 23, 2013	South Dakota State	7,231	73-62 (Win)
21	February 19, 2000	Morehead State	7,199	80-65 (Win)

== Concerts ==
- Tim McGraw - September 26, 1998
- MTV Campus Invasion featuring Garbage and Lit - October 27, 1999
- 3 Doors Down - October 10, 2000
- Lifehouse, The Calling, and Michelle Branch - September 18, 2001
- Nelly and the St. Lunatics, Abyss, Three Strikes, and CORE PROjECT - March 25, 2002
- MTV Campus Invasion 2K2 featuring Nickelback, Default, Injected, and Starsailor - April 18, 2002
- Fuel and Smile Empty Soul - October 13, 2003
- Kanye West - September 20, 2004
- John Mayer and Mat Kearney - February 16, 2007
- Kansas and 38 Special - October 3, 2009
- Maroon 5 - November 2, 2009
- Skillet and TobyMac - March 7, 2010
- Kevin Skinner, Sierra Hull, and Highway 111 - July 3, 2010
- Miranda Lambert - October 8, 2010
- Skillet, Disciple, and Manafest - October 18, 2011
- Casting Crowns, Sanctus Real, The Afters, and Lindsay McCaul - November 10, 2011
- Lady Antebellum, Josh Kelley, and Edens Edge - December 11, 2011
- Eric Church - October 21, 2012
- Bob Dylan - April 27, 2013
- Florida Georgia Line, Colt Ford, and Dallas Smith - October 10, 2013
- Zac Brown Band - February 8, 2014
- Bill Cosby - October 11, 2014
- Jeff Dunham - August 20, 2016
- Eli Young Band and Walker Hayes - February 22, 2020
- Jack Harlow - December 1, 2023

== See also ==
- List of NCAA Division I basketball arenas
