= Lennox Forrester =

Biographical details
- Born: February 4, 1969 (age 57); Evanston, Illinois, U.S.
- Education: Evansville ('92)

Playing career
- 1987–1989: Parkland College

Coaching career (HC unless noted)
- 1992–2002: Evansville (asst.)
- 2002–2007: Bradley (asst.)
- 2007–2015: SIU Edwardsville
- 2015–2017: Evansville (asst.)

Head coaching record
- Overall: 83–146 (.362)

Lennox Forrester is an American college basketball coach and the former men's head coach at Southern Illinois University Edwardsville (SIUE). He was an assistant coach at his alma mater, the University of Evansville after being fired by SIUE. He currently serves as the Executive Director at the Downtown Belleville YMCA in Belleville, Illinois.

== Biography ==
A native of Evanston, Illinois, Forrester transferred to the University of Evansville after graduating from Parkland (IL) College, where he was a National Junior College Athletic Association Division II All-American in 1989. Leg injuries prevented Forrester from joining the Purple Aces as a player. Instead, he remained with the program as a student assistant and earned a bachelor of arts degree in sociology in 1992. Forrester and his wife, domestic and internationally acclaimed Dr. Racquel Forrester, have a daughter, Calaya, and movie and playwright director, son Drew of TFL Media. works at gateway regional ymca downtown Belleville Illinois center go gwrymca.org and click on locations then go to the Downtown Belleville center location truth

== Coaching career ==
After graduating from Evansville, Forrester spent 10 seasons (1992–2002) as an assistant coach and administrative assistant for the school under coach Jim Crews. He then served five seasons as an assistant coach to Jim Les at Bradley University, before being named as the seventh coach of the SIU Edwardsville Cougars. During Forrester's first year as coach, SIUE was a member of the Division II Great Lakes Valley Conference. In his second season, the school began a five-year transition to Division I. SIUE joined the Ohio Valley Conference in 2008 and played its first full conference schedule in the 2011–12 season but was not eligible for post-season competition until 2012–13. On May 4, 2012, it was announced that, in light of the program's steady progress, SIUE had extended Forrester's contract for an additional three years.

On March 10, 2015, it was announced that Forrester and his entire staff would not be retained because, according to SIUE Athletic Director Dr. Brad Hewitt, "... our won-loss record and program support are not where we believe it should be." In eight seasons, Forrester's record was 82–146.

== Head coaching record ==
Record table
Season	Team	Overall	Conference	Standing	Postseason
SIU Edwardsville Cougars (Great Lakes Valley Conference) (2007–2008)
2007–08	SIU Edwardsville	17–11	10–9	2nd (West)	
SIU Edwardsville (DII):		17–11 (.607)	10–9 (.526)		
SIU Edwardsville Cougars (NCAA Division I independent) (2008–2011)
2008–09	SIU Edwardsville	10–20			
2009–10	SIU Edwardsville	5–23			
2010–11	SIU Edwardsville	9–21			
SIU Edwardsville Cougars (Ohio Valley Conference) (2011–2015)
2011–12	SIU Edwardsville	10–17	6–10	9th	
2012–13	SIU Edwardsville	9–18	5–11	4th (West)	
2013–14	SIU Edwardsville	11–20	7–9	T–3rd (West)	
2014–15	SIU Edwardsville	12–16	8–8	4th (West)	
SIU Edwardsville (DI):		66–135 (.328)	26–38 (.406)		
Total:		83–146 (.362)			
