= Bubba Wells =

American basketball player and coach (born 1974)

Personal information
- Born: July 26, 1974 (age 52) Russellville, Kentucky, U.S.
- Listed height: 6 ft 5 in (1.96 m)
- Listed weight: 230 lb (104 kg)

Career information
- High school: Russellville (Russellville, Kentucky)
- College: Austin Peay (1993–1997)
- NBA draft: 1997: 2nd round, 34th overall pick
- Drafted by: Dallas Mavericks
- Playing career: 1997–2005
- Position: Small forward
- Number: 35
- Coaching career: 2005–2022

Career history

Playing
- 1997–1998: Dallas Mavericks
- 1998–1999: La Crosse Bobcats
- 2000–2001: Memphis Houn'Dawgs
- 2001–2002: Dafni
- 2002–2004: Barangay Ginebra Kings
- 2004–2005: Harlem Globetrotters

Coaching
- 2005–2015: Austin Peay (assistant)
- 2015–2022: SIU Edwardsville (assistant)

Career highlights
- OVC Player of the Year (1997); 3× First-team All-OVC (1995–1997); No. 13 retired by Austin Peay Governors
- Stats at NBA.com
- Stats at Basketball Reference

Charles Richard "Bubba" Wells Jr. (born July 26, 1974) is an American basketball coach and former player. He played college basketball for Austin Peay State University and later professionally, including for the Dallas Mavericks in the NBA and Dafni in the Greek Basket League.

== College career ==
Wells played collegiately for Austin Peay State University and was named 1997 Ohio Valley Conference Player of the Year. In his junior season, he averaged 26.3 points per game. He upped those averages during his senior year when he averaged 31.7 points and 7.5 rebounds per game.. In his four-year college career, Wells averaged 21.6 points and 6.9 rebounds per contest. He left the school as its all-time leading scorer with 2,267 points and is a member of the Athletics Hall of Fame. His No. 13 jersey is retired by the school.

== Professional career ==
Wells was selected 34th by the Dallas Mavericks in the 1997 NBA draft and appeared in 39 games during 1997–98 season, starting two games in March 1998, in place of the injured Cedric Ceballos. His best game came on February 19, 1998, when he had 21 points, nine rebounds, and seven assists in a loss to the San Antonio Spurs.

On December 29, 1997, in a game against the Chicago Bulls, Wells set the record for the shortest amount of playing time before fouling out in an NBA regular season game. In the game, Mavericks coach Don Nelson employed a tactic to limit the Bulls' offense by inserting Wells into the game with the express purpose of fouling power forward Dennis Rodman, a notoriously poor free throw shooter, away from the ball. The plan failed, however, when Rodman hit 9-of-12 free throws and Chicago went on to win the game 111–105. Wells fouled out late in the third quarter after registering his sixth personal foul in a total of 2 minutes and 43 seconds playing time. This strategy of intentionally fouling a bad free throw shooter is sometimes called Hack-a-Shaq, since it was later famously used against Shaquille O'Neal. The previous record-holder was Dick Farley of the Syracuse Nationals who was disqualified in five minutes on March 12, 1956.

On June 24, 1998, Wells was traded to the Phoenix Suns along with Martin Müürsepp, the draft rights to Pat Garrity, and a future first-round draft pick in exchange for point guard Steve Nash. In January 1999, Wells, Müürsepp, and Mark Bryant were traded to the Chicago Bulls for Luc Longley. Wells never appeared in a game for Phoenix or Chicago.

He later played for the LaCrosse Bobcats of the CBA, the Oklahoma Storm of USBL, the Memphis Houn'Dawgs of the ABA, Dafni in the Greek Basket League and Barangay Ginebra Kings the Philippine Basketball Association. He played for the Harlem Globetrotters in 2004–05.

== Coaching career ==
From June 2005 through May 2015, Wells was an assistant men's basketball coach at Austin Peay. On May 28, 2015, his appointment to the staff of Jon Harris at SIU Edwardsville was announced.

== Personal life ==
In August 2007, Wells married Tracee Jones, the former head women's basketball coach at Tennessee State University. The previous summer Wells served as a supporter to Jones on NBC TV game show, Deal or No Deal. Wells has a daughter, Alyiah, and a son, Chase.
