= Larry Graham (basketball) =

American basketball player and coach (1942–2020)

Biographical details
- Born: 1942; Scotland, Indiana, U.S.
- Died: August 31, 2020 (aged 77–78); Maryville, Illinois, U.S.
- Education: Texas Wesleyan ('64)

Playing career
- 1960–1962: Vincennes University
- 1962–1964: Texas Wesleyan

Coaching career (HC unless noted)
- 1969–1984: Madison High School (IL) Trojans
- 1984–1992: SIU Edwardsville
- unk.: Oakville High School Lions
- unk.: Florissant Valley Community College Fury
- unk.: Lindenwood Lions (men's asst.)
- unk.: Lindenwood Lions (women's asst.)

Head coaching record
- Overall: 806 wins

Accomplishments and honors

Championships
- IHSA Class A 1977, 1981

Awards
- IHSA Class A Coach of the Year (1977 & 1981); Named one of “100 Legends of Illinois High School Basketball Tournament” (2007); Illinois Basketball Coaches Association Hall of Fame (1994); Missouri Basketball Coaches Association Hall of Fame (2006); Indiana Basketball Hall of Fame (2012); St. Louis Sports Hall of Fame (2018)

Larry Graham (1942 – August 31, 2020) was an American college basketball coach and the former men's head coach at Southern Illinois University Edwardsville (SIUE). He remains the SIUE leader in both total wins and winning percentage.

== Playing career ==
Young Larry "Buddy" Graham of Scotland, Indiana played at tiny Odon High School (since consolidated into North Daviess Junior-Senior High School) in nearby Odon, Indiana. He set records at Odon High School for most career points (1,387) and rebounds (929), and helped lead the Bulldogs to their first-ever sectional and regional championships. Odon lost to New Albany in the quarterfinals of Indiana's single-division state tournament. The loss came in Indiana's last game played with a sudden death ending.

Graham played in college for Vincennes University in Vincennes, Indiana, and then for Texas Wesleyan University in Ft. Worth.

== Coaching history ==
After several seasons as an assistant high school coach in Indiana and Illinois, in 1969, Graham was named the head coach at Madison High School in Madison, Illinois. In fifteen seasons under Coach Graham, the Madison Trojans won 312 games versus only 103 loses. The school won the Illinois High School Association Class A State Championship in 1977 and 1981– the second title coming the year after a fourth-place finish. He was named Illinois Class A coach of the year in both championship seasons. Graham's Trojans played their way into the eight-team State Finals five times. They won 24 games or more eight times in Graham's fifteen seasons, and they won nine straight Class A regional titles from 1975–76 through 1983–84.

In 1981, SIUE had hired Tom Pugliese to build its program toward moving to Division I. While going 17–40 in two seasons, Pugliese and his staff committed so many violations of NCAA rules that the university took the almost unheard of action of suspending the program for at least the 1982–83 season.

In 1984, Graham left Madison to coach Florissant Valley Community College. However, when SIUE announced the return of its program, Graham applied for and was hired as head coach. (He would later return to coach Flo Valley.)

A 7–21 inaugural season was highlighted by the December 1984 opening of the Vadalabene Center, which remains as the home of SIUE basketball. Graham's Cougars were 23–7 in 1985–86 and advanced to the school's first NCAA Division II men's basketball tournament. That was the first of what became seven consecutive winning seasons under Graham. The Cougars advanced to the NCAA Tournament again in 1987 and 1989. Under Coach Graham, the Cougars won 147 games while losing only 84, a winning percentage of 63.6%. Graham's win total and winning percentage remain as the best in the SIUE men's basketball program's history.

After Graham stepped down at SIUE, he did not stay out of coaching. He served as head coach at Oakville (MO) High School and at Florissant Valley Community College, adding another 347 wins to his record. Late in his career, Graham served as an assistant coach to both the men's and women's basketball teams at Lindenwood University.

As a player or coach, Larry Graham was inducted into halls of fame in Indiana, Illinois, and Missouri.

== Head coaching record ==
Record table
Season	Team	Overall	Conference	Standing	Postseason
SIU Edwardsville Cougars (Division II Independent) (1984–1992)
1984–85	SIU Edwardsville	7–21	—	—	
1985–86	SIU Edwardsville	23–7	—	—	1986 NCAA Division II; Regional Runner-up
1986–87	SIU Edwardsville	23–7	—	—	1987 NCAA Division II; Regional Runner-up
1987–88	SIU Edwardsville	19–9	—	—	
1988–89	SIU Edwardsville	23–7	—	—	1987 NCAA Division II; Regional 3rd
1989–90	SIU Edwardsville	21–8	—	—	
1990–91	SIU Edwardsville	16–12	—	—	
1991–92	SIU Edwardsville	15–13	—	—	
SIU Edwardsville:		147–84 (.636)			
Total:		147–84 (.636)			
National champion Postseason invitational champion Conference regular season champion Conference regular season and conference tournament champion Division regular season champion Division regular season and conference tournament champion Conference tournament champion
