= Jon Harris (basketball) =

American college basketball coach (born 1981)

Biographical details
- Born: August 5, 1980 (age 46); Edwardsville, Illinois, U.S.

Playing career
- 1998–2002: Marquette
- Position: Forward

Coaching career (HC unless noted)
- 2002–2003: Marquette (GA)
- 2003–2008: Green Bay (assistant)
- 2008–2011: Missouri State (assistant)
- 2011–2014: Tennessee (assistant)
- 2014–2015: California (assistant)
- 2015–2019: SIU Edwardsville

Head coaching record
- Overall: 31–88 (.261)

Accomplishments and honors

Awards
- St. Louis Post-Dispatch HS Player of the Year (1998)

Jon Harris (born August 5, 1980) is an American college basketball coach who is the former men's head coach at Southern Illinois University Edwardsville (SIUE), an NCAA Division I program competing in the Ohio Valley Conference (OVC). A high school star at Edwardsville High School, Harris played collegiately at Marquette University. He was named the SIUE Cougars' new coach in April 2015 after spending thirteen years as an assistant in five different Division I programs. On March 11, 2019, SIUE announced that Harris' contract had not been renewed.

Harris is currently (Fall 2019) a Recruiting Specialist for Next College Student Athlete, a company that facilitates the contacting of college coaches by high school and middle school students.

== Biography ==
Jon Harris was born in Edwardsville, Illinois in 1980, the son of Robert "Bob" and Mary Ann Harris. He followed in his father's footsteps by starring in basketball at Edwardsville High School (EHS), remaining in town with an aunt when his father's employment was transferred to Chicago. Harris was the 1998 St. Louis Post-Dispatch Player of the Year, a USA Today honorable mention All-American, and an Associated Press (AP) All-State selection. This was despite the team's failure to advance beyond the sectional semifinals in the IHSA state tournament— as a junior, the EHS Tigers lost to Alton in a six overtime game; as a senior, the Tigers fell to Collinsville on a 70-foot "buzzer-beater" with both games played at SIUE's Vadalabene Center.

After graduating from EHS, Harris attended Marquette University in Milwaukee, in his sophomore through senior seasons, coached by Tom Crean. Although he started only 22 games, he had major playing time in every game under Crean, and was team captain as a junior and senior. He finished his playing career ranked #20 on the Conference USA rebounding list and was a career 53% shooter from the floor. Teamed with Dwyane Wade, Harris' 2001–02 Golden Eagles team went 26–7, finishing in the NCAA Tournament and earning a #9 AP ranking. The Golden Eagles fell victim to one of the notorious 12 vs. 5 upsets to Tulsa (one of three that year).

Harris graduated from Marquette in 2002 with a bachelor's degree in psychology. He is married to the former Heidi Bowman, who was also a four-year basketball star at Marquette, earning Conference USA All-Conference honors in 2001. They have three children, Hailey, Leah, and Jaxon.

== Coaching career ==
Harris began his coaching career immediately after graduation, joining Tom Crean's staff as graduate assistant; that 2002–03 team, led by future NBA All-Star Dwyane Wade, built a record of 27–6 on the way to the Final Four. Following that first season at Marquette, Harris moved to the staff of Tod Kowalczyk at Green Bay, becoming, at age 22, the youngest full-time assistant coach in the country. In his five seasons at Green Bay, Harris was instrumental in developing eight All-Horizon League players, and while recruiting Indiana for Green Bay, he got to know then-Purdue assistant Cuonzo Martin. When Martin was named the head coach at Missouri State, he quickly hired Harris as one of his first assistants. The Bears improved from 11 wins in 2008–09 to 24–12 and the CIT championship in 2009–10, and to 26–9 with the school's first Missouri Valley Conference regular season title and the second round of the NIT the following season. When Martin moved on to Tennessee, Harris was his first assistant hired. After seasons of 19–15, 20–13, and 24–13, Martin took the coaching job at California, and Harris followed, but he stayed only one season in Berkeley before returning home for the SIUE job.

After four seasons with a record that was worse than the previous four years, on March 11, 2019, SIUE announced that Harris's contract had not been renewed after a four-year record of 31 and 88 losses. However, Harris's full staff of assistant coaches Brian Barone, Charles "Bubba" Wells, and Mike Waldo and Director of Operations Casey Wyllie were all retained, and Barone was later named as interim head coach.

== Head coaching record ==
Record table
Season	Team	Overall	Conference	Standing	Postseason
SIU Edwardsville Cougars (Ohio Valley Conference) (2015–2019)
2015–16	SIU Edwardsville	6–22	3–13	5th (West)	
2016–17	SIU Edwardsville	6–24	1–15	6th (West)	
2017–18	SIU Edwardsville	9–21	5–13	T–9th	
2018–19	SIU Edwardsville	10–21	6–12	T–7th	
SIU Edwardsville:		31–88 (.261)	15–53 (.221)		
Total:		31–88 (.261)			
National champion Postseason invitational champion Conference regular season champion Conference regular season and conference tournament champion Division regular season champion Division regular season and conference tournament champion Conference tournament champion
