= SIU Edwardsville Cougars men's basketball =

College basketball team

2026–27 SIU Edwardsville Cougars men's basketball team
- University: Southern Illinois University Edwardsville
- Head coach: Brian Barone (8th season)
- Location: Edwardsville, Illinois
- Arena: First Community Arena (capacity: 4,000)
- Conference: Ohio Valley
- Nickname: Cougars
- Colors: Red and white

NCAA Division I tournament appearances
- 2025

NCAA Division II tournament Elite Eight
- 2006
Other NCAA Division II tournament results
Sweet Sixteen	1986, 1987, 2006
Appearances	1986, 1987, 1989, 2005, 2006

Conference tournament champions
- 2025

Uniforms
Home	Away

The SIU Edwardsville Cougars men's basketball team represents Southern Illinois University Edwardsville (SIUE) in the Ohio Valley Conference of NCAA Division I basketball. The Cougars play their home games at the Sam M. Vadalabene Center located in the SIUE core campus in Edwardsville, Illinois. SIU Edwardsville has appeared in the NCAA Division I men's basketball tournament once in 2025.

== History ==
=== NCAA Division II (1967–2007) ===
The SIUE basketball program first entered competition on November 23, 1967, under the leadership of Naismith Memorial Basketball Hall of Fame coach Harry Gallatin. The newborn program had no scholarships, inadequate facilities, and very little money to work with. Home games were played at the Shurtleff College gymnasium in Alton, usually with crowds of fewer than a dozen fans in attendance. Gallatin departed as the program's coach after three years (while remaining as athletic director and golf coach for many years) with a record of 19–31.

Gallatin was succeeded by Jim Dudley, who would head the program for eleven years, compiling a 146–143 record. During Dudley's tenure, home games moved to the gymnasium at Edwardsville High School (now Lincoln Middle School) which was located a short distance from the SIUE campus.

Dudley was followed by Tom Pugliese, whose two years saw a record of 17–40 and brought about NCAA sanctions, resulting in the university administration's decision to suspend the program for the 1983–84 season.

Larry Graham took over as head coach for the 1984-85 season, and the program finally got a home of its own, moving into the new Sam M. Vadalabene Center on campus. Graham was the most successful of the Cougars' coaches, earning a record of 147–84, with three NCAA Division II tournament appearances in his eight seasons.

After Graham, Jack Margenthaler had limited success, achieving a record of 112–150 in ten years.

Success returned to Cougars basketball during Marty Simmons' five years at the helm. Simmons's teams went 88–59, making the NCAA Division II tournament in 2005 and not only returning in 2006, but earning a spot in that season's Elite Eight in Springfield, Massachusetts.

=== NCAA Division I (2008–present) ===
When Simmons returned to his alma mater, as head coach at the University of Evansville, SIUE named long-time Missouri Valley Conference assistant coach Lennox Forrester to be the programs' seventh head coach. Following his first season, the Cougars began the transition from Division II to Division I and membership in the Ohio Valley Conference. Although the Cougars had losing seasons during their transition, they have become more competitive with each season. Through Forrester's first five seasons, his teams finished only 50–92, but his contract was extended following the 2011–12 season. The 2012-13 season was the first season that they were eligible to play in the Ohio Valley Conference Tournament.

On March 10, 2015, it was announced that the contracts of Forrester and his entire staff would not be renewed and that a national search for a new head coach was being launched. On April 3, it was announced that California assistant coach Jon Harris, an Edwardsville native, had been named the 8th head coach in SIUE Basketball history.

On March 11, 2019, SIUE announced that coach Jon Harris' contract had not been renewed after a four-year record of 31 wins and 88 losses. However, Harris' full staff of assistant coaches Brian Barone, Charles "Bubba" Wells, and Mike Waldo and Director of Operations Casey Wyllie were all retained, and Barone was later named as interim head coach.

After serving as the interim head coach throughout the 2019 offseason, Barone was officially named head coach of the Cougars on November 13, 2019, after a 1–2 start to the season.

The Cougars have improved steadily over the first three years of Barone's tenure as head coach, posting win totals of eight in 2019–20, nine in 2020–21 and 11 in 2021–22. The 2020–21 and 2021–22 seasons were both affected heavily by the COVID-19 pandemic. This began with the team's December 13th game at Northwestern cancelled. The Cougars returned to play with a 69–65 win over Morehead State to open OVC play on December 18, however, it would be the last game SIUE would play for 33 days. Following the game against Morehead State, the Cougars had nine consecutive games postponed due to a COVID-19 outbreak on the team. SIUE would go on to play 18 games in 37 days to finish the season. SIUE qualified for the OVC Tournament, losing their opening round game to Belmont 78-61. The following year, SIUE had five games postponed due to COVID-19 concerns, once again qualifying for the OVC Tournament. SIUE lost its first-round matchup to Tennessee State.

In 2025, SIUE won the OVC Tournament championship and made their first NCAA tournament as a Division I school, falling in the first round to #2 overall seed, Houston Cougars.

== All-Americans ==
While the SIUE men's basketball has not seen the success of some other Cougars programs, two players were honored as NCAA Division II All-Americans:

- Keith McFarland 1974–75
- John Edwards 1986–87

== Postseason appearances ==
=== NCAA Division I ===
The Cougars have appeared in the NCAA Division I men's basketball tournament once. Their combined record is 0–1.

Year	Round	Opponent	Result
2025	First round	Houston	L 40–78

=== NCAA Division II ===
The Cougars appeared in the NCAA Division II Tournament five times. Their combined record is 6–5.

Year	Round	Opponent	Result
1986	Regional semifinals Regional Finals	Lewis; Wright State	W 70–61; L 73–77
1987	Regional semifinals Regional Finals	Southern Indiana; Kentucky Wesleyan	W 88–82; L 86–89
1989	Regional semifinals Regional 3rd-place game	Kentucky Wesleyan; Ferris State	L 87–100 ^{OT} W 102–92
2005	Regional Quarterfinals	Wayne State	L 55–56
2006	Regional Quarterfinals; Regional semifinals Regional Finals; Elite Eight	Grand Valley State; Quincy; Southern Indiana; Virginia Union	W 65–61; W 80–69; W 64–60; L 58–60

== Record by year ==
Record table
Season	Coach	Overall	Conference	Standing	Postseason
SIU Edwardsville (Division II Independent) (1967–1995)
1967–68	Harry Gallatin	5–5			
1968–69	Harry Gallatin	7–10			
1969–70	Harry Gallatin	7–16			
Harry Gallatin:		19–31 .380			
1970–71	Jim Dudley	15–11			
1971–72	Jim Dudley	5–21			
1972–73	Jim Dudley	16–9			
1973–74	Jim Dudley	19–7			
1974–75	Jim Dudley	18–8			
1975–76	Jim Dudley	12–15			
1976–77	Jim Dudley	13–14			
1977–78	Jim Dudley	11–14			
1978–79	Jim Dudley	13–14			
1978–80	Jim Dudley	13–14			
1980–81	Jim Dudley	11–16			
Jim Dudley:		146–143 .505			
1981–82	Tom Pugliese	9–16			
1982–83	Tom Pugliese	8–24			
Tom Pugliese:		17–40 .298			
1983–84	---Program Suspended---				
1984–85	Larry Graham	7–21			
1985–86	Larry Graham	23–7			NCAA Div. II Sweet Sixteen
1986–87	Larry Graham	23–7			NCAA Div. II Sweet Sixteen
1987–88	Larry Graham	19–9			
1988–89	Larry Graham	23–7			NCAA Div. II Regional third place
1989–90	Larry Graham	21–8			
1990–91	Larry Graham	16–12			
1991–92	Larry Graham	15–13			
Larry Graham:		147–84 .636			
1992–93	Jack Margenthaler	14–12			
1993–94	Jack Margenthaler	13–13			
1994–95	Jack Margenthaler	10–16			
SIU Edwardsville (Great Lakes Valley Conference (Div. II)) (1995–2008)
1995–96	Jack Margenthaler	10–15	7–13	8th	
1996–97	Jack Margenthaler	11–16	5–15	10th	
1997–98	Jack Margenthaler	18–9	11–7	t-5th	
1998–99	Jack Margenthaler	13–14	12–10	t-5th	
1999–2000	Jack Margenthaler	9–17	5–15	10th	
2000–01	Jack Margenthaler	7–19	4–16	11th	
2001–02	Jack Margenthaler	7–19	3–17	11th	
Jack Margenthaler:		112–150 .427	47–93 .336		
2002–03	Marty Simmons	9–18	5–15	t-8th	
2003–04	Marty Simmons	16–12	11–9	t-5th	
2004–05	Marty Simmons	23–9	15–5	2nd	NCAA Div. II 1st round
2005–06	Marty Simmons	25–8	14–5	t-1st (West)	NCAA Div. II Elite Eight
2006–07	Marty Simmons	15–12	10–9	5th (West)	
Marty Simmons:		88–59 .599	55–43 .561		
2007–08	Lennox Forrester	17–11	10–9	2nd (West)	
SIU Edwardsville (Division I Independent) (2008–2010)
2008–09	Lennox Forrester	10–20			
2009–10	Lennox Forrester	5–23			
SIU Edwardsville (Ohio Valley Conference) (2010–present)
2010–11	Lennox Forrester	8–21	Not eligible	Not eligible	
2011–12	Lennox Forrester	10–17	6–10	9th	
2012–13	Lennox Forrester	9–18	5–11	t-4th (West)	
2013–14	Lennox Forrester	11–20	7–9	t-3rd (West)	
2014–15	Lennox Forrester	12–16	8–8	4th (West)	
Lennox Forrester:		85–146 .368	36–47 .434		
2015–16	Jon Harris	6–22	3–13	5th (West)	
2016–17	Jon Harris	6–24	1–15	6th (West)	
2017-18	Jon Harris	9-21	5-13	t-9	
2018-19	Jon Harris	10-21	6-12	t-7	
Jon Harris:		31–88 .261	15–53 .221		
2019-20	Brian Barone	8-23	5-13	t-10	
2020–21	Brian Barone	9-17	7-12	8th	
2021–22	Brian Barone	11-21	5-13	8th	
2022–23	Brian Barone	19-14	9-9	6th	
2023-24	Brian Barone	17-16	9-9	6th	
2024-25	Brian Barone	22-11	13-7	2nd	NCAA Div. I
Brian Barone:		86–102	48–63 .432		
Total:		691–842 .451			
National champion Postseason invitational champion Conference regular season champion Conference regular season and conference tournament champion Division regular season champion Division regular season and conference tournament champion Conference tournament champion
