= 2017–18 Murray State Racers men's basketball team =

American college basketball season

2017–18 Murray State Racers men's basketball
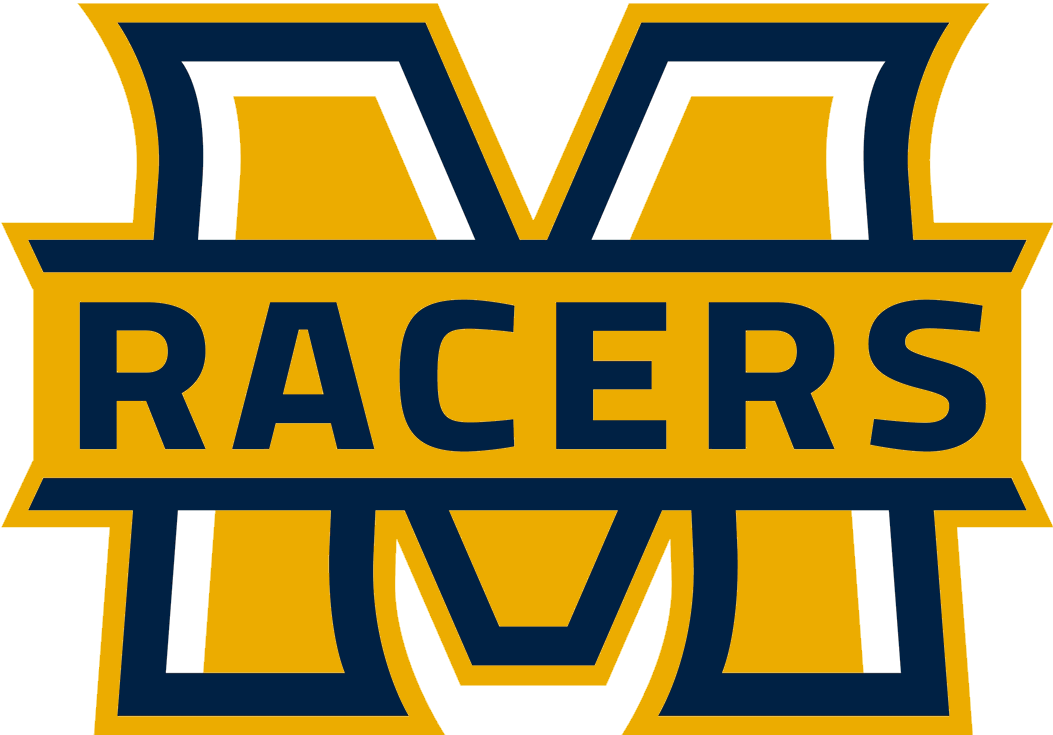

OVC regular season and tournament champions

NCAA tournament, First Round
- Conference: Ohio Valley Conference
- Record: 26–6 (16–2 OVC)
- Head coach: Matt McMahon (3rd season)
- Assistant coaches: Shane Nichols; Tim Kaine; Casey Long
- Home arena: CFSB Center

2017–18 Ohio Valley Conference men's basketball standings
	Conf.				Overall
Team	W		L	PCT	W		L	PCT
Murray State †	16	–	2	.889	26	–	6	.813
Belmont	15	–	3	.833	24	–	9	.727
Austin Peay	12	–	6	.667	19	–	15	.559
Jacksonville State	11	–	7	.611	23	–	13	.639
Tennessee Tech	10	–	8	.556	19	–	14	.576
Tennessee State	10	–	8	.556	15	–	15	.500
Southeast Missouri State*	8	–	10	.444	14	–	17	.452
Eastern Illinois	7	–	11	.389	12	–	19	.387
SIU Edwardsville	5	–	13	.278	9	–	21	.300
UT Martin	5	–	13	.278	10	–	21	.323
Eastern Kentucky	5	–	13	.278	11	–	20	.355
Morehead State	4	–	14	.222	8	–	21	.276
† 2018 OVC tournament winner *ineligible for postseason due to APR violations

The 2017–18 Murray State Racers men's basketball team represented Murray State University during the 2017–18 NCAA Division I men's basketball season. The Racers, led by third-year head coach Matt McMahon, played their home games at the CFSB Center in Murray, Kentucky as members of the Ohio Valley Conference. They finished the season 26–6, 16–2 in OVC play to win the OVC regular season championship. They defeated Jacksonville State and Belmont to become champions of the OVC tournament. They earned the OVC's automatic bid to the NCAA tournament where they lost in the first round to West Virginia.

== Previous season ==
The Racers finished the 2016–17 season 16–17, 8–8 in OVC play to finish in third place in the West Division. As the No. 7 seed in the OVC tournament, they defeated Tennessee Tech and Morehead State before losing to UT Martin in the semifinals.

== Preseason ==
In a vote of conference coaches and sports information directors, Murray State was picked to finish in 3rd place in the OVC. Jonathan Stark was picked as the Preseason OVC Player of the Year, and Terrell Miller was also named to the 2017–18 Preseason All-OVC Men's Basketball Team.

After five years of divisional play in the OVC, the conference eliminated divisions for the 2017–18 season. Additionally, for the first time, each conference team will play 18 conference games.

== Roster ==
2017–18 Murray State Racers men's basketball team
Players
Coaches

Pos.	#	Name	Height	Weight	Year	Previous school	Hometown
F	0	Terrell Miller	6 ft 8 in (2.03 m)	245 lb (111 kg)	Sr	Arlington Country Day School; SW Miss CC	Jacksonville, FL
G	2	Jonathan Stark	6 ft 0 in (1.83 m)	180 lb (82 kg)	RS Sr	Bob Jones HS; Tulane	Munford, TN
F	4	Brion Sanchious	6 ft 8 in (2.03 m)	245 lb (111 kg)	Jr	Northeast HS	Pompano Beach, FL
G	10	Tevin Brown (injured) (redshirt)	6 ft 5 in (1.96 m)	180 lb (82 kg)	Fr	Fairhope HS	Fairhope, AL
G	11	Shaq Buchanan	6 ft 3 in (1.91 m)	190 lb (86 kg)	Jr	Madison Central HS; NE Miss CC	Madison, MS
G	12	Ja Morant	6 ft 3 in (1.91 m)	170 lb (77 kg)	Fr	Crestwood HS	Dalzell, SC
F	13	Devin Gilmore	6 ft 6 in (1.98 m)	200 lb (91 kg)	Fr	Madison-Ridgeland Academy	Picayune, MS
G	22	Brion Whitley	6 ft 4 in (1.93 m)	195 lb (88 kg)	Fr	Riverview HS	Sarasota, FL
G	23	Jachai Taylor	6 ft 7 in (2.01 m)	195 lb (88 kg)	So	Waukegan HS	Waukegan, IL
F	24	Anthony Smith	6 ft 7 in (2.01 m)	225 lb (102 kg)	Jr	Potomac HS; Barton CC	Suitland, MD
G	25	Byron Hawkins	6 ft 1 in (1.85 m)	180 lb (82 kg)	RS Jr	Clinton Christian HS; Towson	Fort Washington, MD
G	35	Zach Hopewell	6 ft 1 in (1.85 m)	175 lb (79 kg)	Fr	Apollo HS	Owensboro, KY
F	40	Jalen Dupree	6 ft 9 in (2.06 m)	240 lb (109 kg)	So	Cordova HS	Cordova, TN

Head coach

- Matt McMahon (Appalachian State)

Assistant coach(es)

- Shane Nichols (Wofford)
- Tim Kaine (Winthrop)
- Casey Long (Chattanooga)

Legend

- (C) Team captain
- (S) Suspended
- (I) Ineligible
- (W) Walk-on
- Injured
- Current redshirt

Roster
Last update: November 9, 2017

== Schedule and results ==
Date time, TV	Rank^{#}	Opponent^{#}	Result	Record	Site (attendance) city, state
Exhibition
Nov 2, 2017*; 7:00 pm		McKendree	W 98–82		CFSB Center; Murray, KY
Non-conference regular season
Nov 11, 2017*; 7:00 pm		Brescia	W 118–61	1–0	CFSB Center (2,993); Murray, KY
Nov 13, 2017*; 7:00 pm		Middle Tennessee	L 67–72	1–1	CFSB Center (3,854); Murray, KY
Nov 18, 2017*; 6:00 pm, ESPN3		at Wright State	W 80–61	2–1	Nutter Center (4,009); Fairborn, OH
Nov 25, 2017*; 7:00 pm		Southern Illinois	W 81–73	3–1	CFSB Center (3,062); Murray, KY
Nov 28, 2017*; 7:00 pm		Harris–Stowe	W 85–56	4–1	CFSB Center (2,542); Murray, KY
Dec 2, 2017*; 7:00 pm		Florida A&M	W 80–59	5–1	CFSB Center (3,021); Murray, KY
Dec 9, 2017*; 3:00 pm, NBCSC		at Illinois State	W 78–72	6–1	Redbird Arena (5,150); Normal, IL
Dec 12, 2017*; 7:00 pm, FSMW		at Saint Louis	L 55–69	6–2	Chaifetz Arena (4,971); St. Louis, MO
Dec 16, 2017*; 7:00 pm		Marist	W 100–63	7–2	CFSB Center (2,250); Murray, KY
Dec 19, 2017*; 7:00 pm		Auburn	L 77–81	7–3	CFSB Center (6,478); Murray, KY
Dec 22, 2017*; 6:00 pm, ESPN3		at Detroit	W 81–72	8–3	Calihan Hall (1,107); Detroit, MI
Ohio Valley Conference regular season
Dec 28, 2017; 7:00 pm		Eastern Illinois	W 80–52	9–3 (1–0)	CFSB Center (2,846); Murray, KY
Dec 30, 2017; 7:00 pm		SIU Edwardsville	W 87–63	10–3 (2–0)	CFSB Center (2,986); Murray, KY
Jan 4, 2018; 7:00 pm		Southeast Missouri State	W 89–73	11–3 (3–0)	CFSB Center (2,728); Murray, KY
Jan 6, 2018; 7:00 pm		UT Martin	W 82–58	12–3 (4–0)	CFSB Center (4,781); Murray, KY
Jan 11, 2018; 7:30 pm		at Jacksonville State	L 71–76	12–4 (4–1)	Pete Mathews Coliseum (3,004); Jacksonville, AL
Jan 13, 2018; 7:30 pm		at Tennessee Tech	W 71–45	13–4 (5–1)	Eblen Center (2,054); Cookeville, TN
Jan 18, 2018; 6:00 pm, ESPNU		at Belmont	L 72–79	13–5 (5–2)	Curb Event Center (2,354); Nashville, TN
Jan 20, 2018; 7:30 pm		at Tennessee State	W 76–57	14–5 (6–2)	Gentry Complex (2,611); Nashville, TN
Jan 25, 2018; 6:00 pm, ESPNU		Morehead State	W 87–81	15–5 (7–2)	CFSB Center (4,454); Murray, KY
Jan 27, 2018; 7:00 pm		Eastern Kentucky	W 88–73	16–5 (8–2)	CFSB Center (4,070); Murray, KY
Feb 1, 2018; 7:00 pm		at Southeast Missouri State	W 87–75	17–5 (9–2)	Show Me Center (2,035); Cape Girardeau, MO
Feb 03, 2018; 6:00 pm		at UT Martin	W 66–53	18–5 (10–2)	Skyhawk Arena (3,247); Martin, TN
Feb 8, 2018; 6:00 pm, CBSSN		Austin Peay	W 84–63	19–5 (11–2)	CFSB Center (4,339); Murray, KY
Feb 10, 2018; 1:00 pm, FSMW		at SIU Edwardsville	W 75–66	20–5 (12–2)	Vadalabene Center (1,517); Edwardsville, IL
Feb 15, 2018; 7:00 pm		Jacksonville State	W 68–60	21–5 (13–2)	CFSB Center (3,902); Murray, KY
Feb 17, 2018; 7:00 pm		Tennessee Tech	W 75–65	22–5 (14–2)	CFSB Center (6,495); Murray, KY
Feb 22, 2018; 7:30 pm		at Eastern Illinois	W 76–66	23–5 (15–2)	Lantz Arena (1,313); Charleston, IL
Feb 24, 2018; 7:00 pm		at Austin Peay	W 73–64	24–5 (16–2)	Dunn Center (4,343); Clarksville, TN
Ohio Valley Conference tournament
Mar 2, 2018; 7:00 pm, ESPNU	(1)	vs. (4) Jacksonville State; Semifinals	W 70–63	25–5	Ford Center (3,403); Evansville, IN
Mar 3, 2018; 7:00 pm, ESPN2	(1)	vs. (2) Belmont; Championship	W 68–51	26–5	Ford Center (4,280); Evansville, IN
NCAA tournament
Mar 16, 2018*; 3:00 pm, TNT	(12 E)	vs. (5 E) No. 15 West Virginia; First Round	L 68–85	26–6	Viejas Arena (10,892); San Diego, CA
*Non-conference game. (#) Tournament seedings in parentheses. W=West Source. All times are in Central Time.
