= 2018 Ohio Valley Conference men's basketball tournament =

- Classification: Division I
- Season: 2017–18
- Teams: 8
- Site: Ford Center; Evansville, Indiana
- Champions: Murray State (16th title)
- Winning coach: Matt McMahon (1st title)
- MVP: Jonathan Stark (Murray State)
- Television: OVCDN/ESPN3, ESPNU, ESPN2

2017–18 Ohio Valley Conference men's basketball standings
	Conf.				Overall
Team	W		L	PCT	W		L	PCT
Murray State †	16	–	2	.889	26	–	6	.813
Belmont	15	–	3	.833	24	–	9	.727
Austin Peay	12	–	6	.667	19	–	15	.559
Jacksonville State	11	–	7	.611	23	–	13	.639
Tennessee Tech	10	–	8	.556	19	–	14	.576
Tennessee State	10	–	8	.556	15	–	15	.500
Southeast Missouri State*	8	–	10	.444	14	–	17	.452
Eastern Illinois	7	–	11	.389	12	–	19	.387
SIU Edwardsville	5	–	13	.278	9	–	21	.300
UT Martin	5	–	13	.278	10	–	21	.323
Eastern Kentucky	5	–	13	.278	11	–	20	.355
Morehead State	4	–	14	.222	8	–	21	.276
*ineligible for postseason due to APR violations
† 2018 OVC tournament winner

The 2018 Ohio Valley Conference men's basketball tournament was the postseason men's basketball tournament that completed the 2017–18 season in the Ohio Valley Conference. The tournament was held February 28 through March 3, 2018 at Ford Center in Evansville, Indiana.

Regular-season champion Murray State defeated Belmont in the championship game to win the tournament and received conference's automatic bid to the NCAA tournament.

== Seeds ==
Only the top eight teams in the conference qualified for the Tournament. Teams were seeded by record within the division and conference, with a tiebreaker system to seed teams with identical conference The No. 1 and No. 2 seeds received double byes to the semifinals under the merit-based format. The No. 3 and No. 4 seeds received a single bye to the quarterfinals. records.

Southeast Missouri State, despite finishing in seventh place, was ineligible for the tournament due to Academic Progress Rate violations.

Seed	School	Conf.	Tiebreaker
1	Murray State	16–2	
2	Belmont	15–3	
3	Austin Peay	12–6	
4	Jacksonville State	11–7	
5	Tennessee Tech	10–8	2–0 vs TSU
6	Tennessee State	10–8	0–2 vs TT
7	Eastern Illinois	7–11	
8	SIU Edwardsville	5–13	2–1 vs EKU/UTM
–	UT Martin	5–13	2–2 vs SIUE/EKU
–	Eastern Kentucky	5–13	1–2 vs SIUE/UTM

== Schedule ==
Game	Time	Matchup	Score	Television
First round – Wednesday, February 28
1	6:30 pm	No. 5 Tennessee Tech vs No. 8 SIU Edwardsville	60–51	OVC Digital Network
2	8:30 pm	No. 6 Tennessee State vs No. 7 Eastern Illinois	71–73	OVC Digital Network
Quarterfinals – Thursday, March 1
3	6:30 pm	No. 4 Jacksonville State vs No. 5 Tennessee Tech	73–70	OVC Digital Network
4	8:30 pm	No. 3 Austin Peay vs No. 7 Eastern Illinois	73–66	OVC Digital Network
Semifinals – Friday, March 2
5	7:00 pm	No. 1 Murray State vs No. 4 Jacksonville State	70–63	ESPNU
6	9:00 pm	No. 2 Belmont vs No. 3 Austin Peay	94–79	ESPNU
Championship – Saturday, March 3
7	7:00 pm	No. 1 Murray State vs No. 2 Belmont	68–51	ESPN2
All game times in Central Time Zone.

== Bracket ==
First round Wednesday, February 28; OVCDN
5	Tennessee Tech	60
8	SIU Edwardsville	51
6	Tennessee State	71
7	Eastern Illinois	73

Quarterfinals; Thursday, March 1 OVCDN
4	Jacksonville State	73
5	Tennessee Tech	70
3	Austin Peay	73
7	Eastern Illinois	66

Semifinals; Friday, March 2 ESPNU
1	Murray State	70
4	Jacksonville State	63
2	Belmont	94
3	Austin Peay	79

Championship; Saturday, March 3 ESPN2
1	Murray State	68
2	Belmont	51

== See also ==
- 2018 Ohio Valley Conference women's basketball tournament
