= 2017–18 Morehead State Eagles men's basketball team =

American college basketball season

2017–18 Morehead State Eagles men's basketball
- Conference: Ohio Valley Conference
- Record: 8–21 (4–14 OVC)
- Head coach: Preston Spradlin (1st season)
- Assistant coaches: J.T. Burton; Beau Braden; Jonathan Mattox
- Home arena: Ellis Johnson Arena

2017–18 Ohio Valley Conference men's basketball standings
	Conf.				Overall
Team	W		L	PCT	W		L	PCT
Murray State †	16	–	2	.889	26	–	6	.813
Belmont	15	–	3	.833	24	–	9	.727
Austin Peay	12	–	6	.667	19	–	15	.559
Jacksonville State	11	–	7	.611	23	–	13	.639
Tennessee Tech	10	–	8	.556	19	–	14	.576
Tennessee State	10	–	8	.556	15	–	15	.500
Southeast Missouri State*	8	–	10	.444	14	–	17	.452
Eastern Illinois	7	–	11	.389	12	–	19	.387
SIU Edwardsville	5	–	13	.278	9	–	21	.300
UT Martin	5	–	13	.278	10	–	21	.323
Eastern Kentucky	5	–	13	.278	11	–	20	.355
Morehead State	4	–	14	.222	8	–	21	.276
† 2018 OVC tournament winner *ineligible for postseason due to APR violations

The 2017–18 Morehead State Eagles men's basketball team represented Morehead State University during the 2017–18 NCAA Division I men's basketball season. The Eagles, led by first-year head coach Preston Spradlin, played their home games at Ellis Johnson Arena in Morehead, Kentucky as members of the Ohio Valley Conference. They finished the season 8–21, 4–14 in OVC play to finish in last place. They failed to qualify for the OVC tournament.

== Previous season ==
The Eagles finished the 2016–17 season 14–16, 10–6 in OVC play to finish in second place in the East Division. In the OVC tournament they lost to Murray State in the quarterfinals.

On November 22, 2016, Morehead State suspended head coach Sean Woods with pay while the school investigated complaints made against Woods. Assistant coach Preston Spradlin was named interim head coach. On December 15, two days after Woods was charged with misdemeanor battery in Indiana for allegedly assaulting two of his players during a game versus Evansville, it was announced that Woods had resigned. It was announced that Spradlin would continue as interim coach while the school conducted a nationwide search for a replacement. On March 16, 2017, Spradlin was named full-time head coach.

== Preseason ==
In a vote of conference coaches and sports information directors, Morehead State was picked to finish in 9th place in the OVC.

After five years of divisional play in the OVC, the conference eliminated divisions for the 2017–18 season. Additionally, for the first time, each conference team will play 18 conference games.

== Roster ==
2017–18 Morehead State Eagles men's basketball team
Players
Coaches

Pos.	#	Name	Height	Weight	Year	Previous school	Hometown
G	0	A.J. Hicks	6 ft 0 in (1.83 m)	185 lb (84 kg)	Jr	Meadowcreek HS; Columbia State CC	Norcross, GA
F	1	Londell King	6 ft 7 in (2.01 m)	220 lb (100 kg)	So	Godby HS; Gulf Coast State	Tallahassee, FL
G	2	Jordan Walker	6 ft 0 in (1.83 m)	185 lb (84 kg)	So	Cathedral HS	Indianapolis, IN
F	3	James Baker	6 ft 6 in (1.98 m)	195 lb (88 kg)	Fr	Meade County HS	Brandenburg, KY
G	4	De'Von Cooper	6 ft 3 in (1.91 m)	190 lb (86 kg)	Fr	Waggener HS	Louisville, KY
F	5	Cedric Wright	6 ft 7 in (2.01 m)	230 lb (104 kg)	RS So	Dillard HS; Chipola JC	Ft. Lauderdale, FL
F	10	Alonzo Chatman	6 ft 7 in (2.01 m)	215 lb (98 kg)	So	Morgan Park HS	Chicago, IL
G	11	Richard Feagin	6 ft 0 in (1.83 m)	160 lb (73 kg)	Fr	Southfield Christian School	Detroit, MI
F	13	Lamontray Harris	6 ft 7 in (2.01 m)	220 lb (100 kg)	Jr	Pleasure Ridge Park HS; Robinson Prep	Louisville, KY
G	14	Treyce Spurlock	6 ft 3 in (1.91 m)	180 lb (82 kg)	Fr	Harlan County HS	Harlan, KY
G	21	Trell Thompson	6 ft 3 in (1.91 m)	195 lb (88 kg)	RS Jr	McComb HS; Southwest Mississippi CC	McComb, MS
G	23	Austin Crawford	6 ft 2 in (1.88 m)	200 lb (91 kg)	Fr	Bracken County HS	Brooksville, KY
G	32	Djimon Henson	6 ft 3 in (1.91 m)	195 lb (88 kg)	So	Lawrence North HS	Indianapolis, IN

Head coach

- Preston Spradlin (Alice Lloyd)

Assistant coach(es)

- J.T. Burton (Tennessee Wesleyan)
- Beau Braden (Centre)
- Jonathan Mattox (Emmanuel)

Legend

- (C) Team captain
- (S) Suspended
- (I) Ineligible
- (W) Walk-on
- Injured
- Current redshirt

Roster
Last update: November 8, 2017

== Schedule and results ==
Date time, TV	Opponent	Result	Record	Site (attendance) city, state
Exhibition
October 30, 2017*; 7:00 pm	at Kentucky; Kentucky Cares Classic	L 67–92		Rupp Arena (14,138); Lexington, KY
November 6, 2017*; 7:00 pm	Cincinnati Christian	W 85–74		Ellis Johnson Arena (563); Morehead, KY
Non-conference regular season
November 10, 2017*; 7:00 pm, FSN	at No. 17 Xavier	L 49–101	0–1	Cintas Center (10,224); Cincinnati, OH
November 12, 2017*; 5:00 pm, ESPN3	at Lipscomb	L 70–77	0–2	Allen Arena (561); Nashville, TN
November 16, 2017*; 7:00 pm	Marshall	W 86–83	1–2	Ellis Johnson Arena (3,857); Morehead, KY
November 21, 2017*; 7:00 pm, ESPN3	at IUPUI	L 61–67	1–3	Indiana Farmers Coliseum (1,012); Indianapolis, IN
November 25, 2017*; 1:00 pm, ACCN Extra	at Virginia Tech	L 63–96	1–4	Cassell Coliseum (5,390); Blacksburg, VA
November 27, 2017*; 8:00 pm	at Central Arkansas	L 78–82	1–5	Farris Center (715); Conway, AR
November 30, 2017*; 6:00 pm	Alice Lloyd	W 103–56	2–5	Ellis Johnson Arena (2,387); Morehead, KY
December 2, 2017*; 7:00 pm, CW Cincinnati	at Northern Kentucky	L 49–86	2–6	BB&T Arena (4,064); Highland Heights, KY
December 12, 2017*; 11:00 am	Kentucky Christian	W 85–57	3–6	Ellis Johnson Arena (4,157); Morehead, KY
December 17, 2017*; 2:00 pm	Central Arkansas	W 98–94	4–6	Ellis Johnson Arena (2,208); Morehead, KY
December 19, 2017*; 8:30 pm, FS1	at Butler	L 69–85	4–7	Hinkle Fieldhouse (7,122); Indianapolis, IN
Ohio Valley Conference regular season
December 28, 2017; 8:30 pm	at Tennessee Tech	L 67–69	4–8 (0–1)	Eblen Center (1,638); Cookeville, TN
December 30, 2017; 5:30 pm	at Jacksonville State	L 69–76	4–9 (0–2)	Pete Mathews Coliseum (1,011); Jacksonville, AL
January 4, 2018; 6:00 pm	Eastern Illinois	L 52–61	4–10 (0–3)	Ellis Johnson Arena (1,855); Morehead, KY
January 6, 2018; 4:15 pm	SIU Edwardsville	L 65–70	4–11 (0–4)	Ellis Johnson Arena (1,442); Morehead, KY
January 11, 2018; 8:30 pm	at Southeast Missouri State	L 75–78	4–12 (0–5)	Show Me Center (915); Cape Girardeau, MO
January 13, 2017; 7:00 pm	at UT Martin	W 71–67	5–12 (1–5)	Skyhawk Arena (1,013); Martin, TN
January 18, 2018; 7:00 pm, CBSSN	Jacksonville State	L 57–58	5–13 (1–6)	Ellis Johnson Arena (3,673); Morehead, KY
January 20, 2018; 4:15 pm	Tennessee Tech	W 74–55	6–13 (2–6)	Ellis Johnson Arena (3,623); Morehead, KY
January 25, 2017; 7:00 pm, ESPNU	at Murray State	L 81–87	6–14 (2–7)	CFSB Center (4,454); Murray, KY
January 27, 2017; 8:00 pm	at Austin Peay	L 76–92	6–15 (2–8)	Dunn Center (2,345); Clarksville, TN
February 1, 2018; 7:30 pm	Tennessee State	L 58–61	6–16 (2–9)	Ellis Johnson Arena (2,237); Morehead, KY
February 3, 2018; 4:00 pm	Belmont	L 73–83	6–17 (2–10)	Ellis Johnson Arena (3,292); Morehead, KY
February 8, 2018; 7:30 pm	Southeast Missouri State	L 62–78	6–18 (2–11)	Ellis Johnson Arena (3,315); Morehead, KY
February 10, 2017; 7:00 pm	at Eastern Kentucky	L 73–75	6–19 (2–12)	McBrayer Arena (2,620); Richmond, KY
February 15, 2017; 8:30 pm	at Tennessee State	L 74–83	6–20 (2–13)	Gentry Complex (2,511); Nashville, TN
February 17, 2017; 6:15 pm, CBSSN	at Belmont	L 65–108	6–21 (2–14)	Curb Event Center (2,689); Nashville, TN
February 22, 2018; 7:30 pm	UT Martin	W 70–53	7–21 (3–14)	Ellis Johnson Arena (1,873); Morehead, KY
February 24, 2018; 2:00 pm	Eastern Kentucky	W 70–66	8–21 (4–14)	Ellis Johnson Arena (3,947); Morehead, KY
*Non-conference game. (#) Tournament seedings in parentheses. All times are in Eastern Time.
