= 2017–18 Tennessee Tech Golden Eagles men's basketball team =

American college basketball season

2017–18 Tennessee Tech Golden Eagles men's basketball

Emerald Coast Classic Pool B champions
- Conference: Ohio Valley Conference
- East Division
- Record: 19–14 (10–8 OVC)
- Head coach: Steve Payne (7th season)
- Assistant coaches: Jason Taylor; Gus Fraley; Gerald Gillion
- Home arena: Eblen Center

2017–18 Ohio Valley Conference men's basketball standings
	Conf.				Overall
Team	W		L	PCT	W		L	PCT
Murray State †	16	–	2	.889	26	–	6	.813
Belmont	15	–	3	.833	24	–	9	.727
Austin Peay	12	–	6	.667	19	–	15	.559
Jacksonville State	11	–	7	.611	23	–	13	.639
Tennessee Tech	10	–	8	.556	19	–	14	.576
Tennessee State	10	–	8	.556	15	–	15	.500
Southeast Missouri State*	8	–	10	.444	14	–	17	.452
Eastern Illinois	7	–	11	.389	12	–	19	.387
SIU Edwardsville	5	–	13	.278	9	–	21	.300
UT Martin	5	–	13	.278	10	–	21	.323
Eastern Kentucky	5	–	13	.278	11	–	20	.355
Morehead State	4	–	14	.222	8	–	21	.276
† 2018 OVC tournament winner *ineligible for postseason due to APR violations

The 2017–18 Tennessee Tech Golden Eagles men's basketball team represented Tennessee Technological University during the 2017–18 NCAA Division I men's basketball season. The Golden Eagles, led by seventh-year head coach Steve Payne, played their home games at the Eblen Center in Cookeville, Tennessee as members of the Ohio Valley Conference. They finished the season 19–14, 10–8 in OVC play to finish in a tie for fifth place. They defeated SIU Edwardsville in the first round of the OVC tournament to advance to the quarterfinals, where they lost to Jacksonville State.

== Previous season ==
The Eagles finished the season 12–20, 8–8 in OVC play to finish in a tie for fourth place in the East Division. As the No. 6 seed in the OVC tournament, they lost in the first round to Murray State.

== Preseason ==
In a vote of conference coaches and sports information directors, Tennessee Tech was picked to finish in 5th place in the OVC. Aleksa Jugovic was named to the 2017–18 Preseason All-OVC Men's Basketball Team.

After five years of divisional play in the OVC, the conference eliminated divisions for the 2017–18 season. Additionally, for the first time, each conference team would play 18 conference games.

== Roster ==
2017–18 Tennessee Tech Golden Eagles men's basketball team
Players
Coaches

Pos.	#	Name	Height	Weight	Year	Hometown
G	0	Shaq Calhoun	6 ft 4 in (1.93 m)	195 lb (88 kg)	Sr	Rome, Georgia
G	1	Maverick Smith	6 ft 5 in (1.96 m)	185 lb (84 kg)	Fr	Oakdale, Tennessee
G	3	Corey Tillery	6 ft 0 in (1.83 m)	165 lb (75 kg)	So	Atlanta, GA
G	4	Aleksa Jugovic	6 ft 3 in (1.91 m)	185 lb (84 kg)	Sr	Leskovac, Serbia
F	5	Joan Duran	6 ft 8 in (2.03 m)	230 lb (104 kg)	Jr	Santo Domingo, Dominican Republic
G	10	Kajon Mack	6 ft 3 in (1.91 m)	190 lb (86 kg)	RS Sr	Los Angeles, California
C	11	Micaiah Henry	6 ft 9 in (2.06 m)	235 lb (107 kg)	RS So	Decatur, Georgia
G	14	Stephaun Adams	6 ft 2 in (1.88 m)	175 lb (79 kg)	Jr	Saint Thomas, U.S. Virgin Islands
F	15	Curtis Phillips, Jr.	6 ft 5 in (1.96 m)	185 lb (84 kg)	Sr	Memphis, Tennessee
G	20	Hunter Vick	6 ft 4 in (1.93 m)	170 lb (77 kg)	Fr	Camden, Tennessee
F	22	Courtney Alexander II	6 ft 7 in (2.01 m)	205 lb (93 kg)	Jr	Mableton, Georgia
F	25	Mason Ramsey	6 ft 6 in (1.98 m)	230 lb (104 kg)	Sr	Livingston, Tennessee
F	33	Domen Omladič	6 ft 8 in (2.03 m)	240 lb (109 kg)	Fr	Žalec, Slovenia
G	54	Cade Crosland	6 ft 0 in (1.83 m)	180 lb (82 kg)	So	Sparta, Tennessee

Head coach

- Steve Payne (Union Commonwealth)

Assistant coach(es)

- Jason Taylor (Jacksonville State)
- Gus Fraley (North Carolina)
- Gerald Gillion (Florida State)

Legend

- (C) Team captain
- (S) Suspended
- (I) Ineligible
- (W) Walk-on
- Injured
- Current redshirt

Roster
Last update: November 9, 2017

== Schedule and results ==
Date time, TV	Rank^{#}	Opponent^{#}	Result	Record	Site (attendance) city, state
Non-conference regular season
Nov 10, 2017*; 7:30 pm		Midway	W 94–56	1–0	Eblen Center (2,071); Cookeville, TN
Nov 13, 2017*; 8:00 pm, FSSW+		at TCU; Emerald Coast Classic campus-site game	L 63–100	1–1	Schollmaier Arena (6,019); Fort Worth, TX
Nov 16, 2017*; 6:00 pm		Boyce	W 106–46	2–1	Eblen Center (756); Cookeville, TN
Nov 18, 2017*; 6:00 pm		Kennesaw State	W 82–68	3–1	Eblen Center (1,116); Cookeville, TN
Nov 21, 2017*; 8:00 pm		at New Mexico; Emerald Coast Classic campus-site game	W 104–96	4–1	Dreamstyle Arena (9,703); Albuquerque, NM
Nov 24, 2017*; 11:00 am		vs. Omaha; Emerald Coast Classic Pool B semifinals	W 86–85	5–1	The Arena at NFSC (325); Niceville, FL
Nov 25, 2017*; 12:30 pm		vs. Maryland Eastern Shore; Emerald Coast Classic Pool B finals	W 90–60	6–1	The Arena at NFSC (125); Niceville, FL
Nov 29, 2017*; 6:00 pm		Lipscomb	W 86–80	7–1	Eblen Center (1,327); Cookeville, TN
Dec 2, 2017*; 4:00 pm, ESPN3		at Furman	L 50–64	7–2	Timmons Arena (1,002); Greenville, SC
Dec 6, 2017*; 6:00 pm, SPEC		at Dayton	L 66–79	7–3	UD Arena (12,976); Dayton, OH
Dec 9, 2017*; 12:00 pm		at Central Michigan	L 69–74	7–4	McGuirk Arena (1,956); Mount Pleasant, MI
Dec 17, 2017*; 2:00 pm		Chattanooga	W 82–76	8–4	Eblen Center (1,039); Cookeville, TN
Dec 21, 2017*; 7:00 pm, BTN		at Indiana	L 59–87	8–5	Simon Skjodt Assembly Hall (12,122); Bloomington, IN
Ohio Valley Conference regular season
Dec 28, 2017; 7:30 pm		Morehead State	W 69–67	9–5 (1–0)	Eblen Center (1,638); Cookeville, TN
Dec 30, 2017; 7:00 pm, CBSSN		Eastern Kentucky	W 77–69	10–5 (2–0)	Eblen Center (2,596); Cookeville, TN
Jan 4, 2018; 7:00 pm		at Belmont	L 67–80	10–6 (2–1)	Curb Event Center (1,807); Nashville, TN
Jan 6, 2018; 4:00 pm		at Tennessee State	W 87–81	11–6 (3–1)	Gentry Complex (1,127); Nashville, TN
Jan 11, 2018; 7:30 pm		Austin Peay	W 86–74	12–6 (4–1)	Eblen Center (1,334); Cookeville, TN
Jan 13, 2018; 7:30 pm		Murray State	L 45–71	12–7 (4–2)	Eblen Center (2,054); Cookeville, TN
Jan 18, 2018; 7:00 pm		at Eastern Kentucky	W 70–67	13–7 (5–2)	McBrayer Arena (1,590); Richmond, KY
Jan 20, 2018; 3:15 pm		at Morehead State	L 55–74	13–8 (5–3)	Ellis Johnson Arena (3,623); Morehead, KY
Jan 25, 2018; 7:30 pm		Southeast Missouri State	W 76–65	14–8 (6–3)	Eblen Center (1,936); Cookeville, TN
Jan 27, 2018; 7:30 pm		UT Martin	W 63–55	15–8 (7–3)	Eblen Center (2,283); Cookeville, TN
Feb 1, 2018; 7:00 pm		at SIU Edwardsville	W 68–67	16–8 (8–3)	Vadalabene Center (1,153); Edwardsville, IL
Feb 3, 2018; 3:15 pm		at Eastern Illinois	L 71–79	16–9 (8–4)	Lantz Arena (1,831); Charleston, IL
Feb 8, 2018; 8:00 pm, ESPNU		at Jacksonville State	L 65–82	16–10 (8–5)	Pete Mathews Coliseum (2,009); Jacksonville, AL
Feb 10, 2018; 7:30 pm		Belmont	L 70–75	16–11 (8–6)	Eblen Center (4,058); Cookeville, TN
Feb 15, 2018; 7:30 pm		at Austin Peay	W 86–80	17–11 (9–6)	Dunn Center (1,613); Clarksville, TN
Feb 17, 2018; 7:30 pm		at Murray State	L 65–75	17–12 (9–7)	CFSB Center (6,495); Murray, KY
Feb 22, 2018; 7:30 pm		Tennessee State	W 69–64	18–12 (10–7)	Eblen Center (2,659); Cookeville, TN
Feb 24, 2018; 7:30 pm		Jacksonville State	L 57–66	18–13 (10–8)	Eblen Center (2,757); Cookeville, TN
Ohio Valley Conference tournament
Feb 28, 2018; 6:30 pm	(5)	vs. (8) SIU Edwardsville; First round	W 60–51	19–13	Ford Center (654); Evansville, IN
Mar 1, 2018; 6:30 pm	(5)	vs. (4) Jacksonville State; Quarterfinals	L 70–73	19–14	Ford Center (914); Evansville, IN
*Non-conference game. (#) Tournament seedings in parentheses. All times are in Central Time.
