= Dan McHale =

American college basketball coach (born 1979)

Biographical details
- Born: 1979 (age 46–47)
- Education: Kentucky

Coaching career (HC unless noted)
- 2002–2004: Louisville (staff assistant)
- 2004–2005: Manhattan (director of ops.)
- 2005–2007: Louisville (director of video ops.)
- 2007–2010: Iona (assistant)
- 2010–2013: Seton Hall (assistant)
- 2013–2015: Minnesota (assistant)
- 2015–2018: Eastern Kentucky
- 2019–2021: New Mexico (assistant)
- 2021-2022: New Mexico (Special Assistant)

Head coaching record
- Overall: 38–55 (.409)

Dan McHale (born 1979) is a former American college basketball coach who most recently served as the special assistant to the head coach at New Mexico. He served as the head men's basketball coach at Eastern Kentucky University from 2015 to 2018.

== Early life ==
McHale is a native of Chatham, New Jersey. He attended Morristown–Beard School before enrolling in University of Kentucky, where he studied as a business major. While at UK, he was a student basketball manager, earning a scholarship for his position his senior year. He graduated with a bachelors degree in business administration with honors in 2001.

== Career ==
McHale was a staff assistant at Louisville from 2002 to 2004. McHale spent a season at Manhattan as the director of operations before returning to Louisville as the director of video operations. In 2007, he was hired as an assistant at Iona under Kevin Willard. McHale recruited Scott Machado to Iona and helped the team to 21 wins in his third season. He followed Willard to Seton Hall in 2010. He was hired at Minnesota in 2013 and spent two seasons as an assistant there, earning an NIT title in his first.

In April 2015, he was hired as head coach at Eastern Kentucky, replacing Jeff Neubauer. He used the full-court press and matchup zone defense he learned while an assistant for Rick Pitino.

On February 26, 2018 McHale was dismissed by EKU after three seasons.

On June 20, 2019 McHale was hired by the University of New Mexico as an assistant coach under Paul Weir. He is also partner and head of collegiate sports at Odgers Berndtson. He also founded McHale Basketball Academy in Chatham, New Jersey.

== Personal life ==
McHale and his wife Jackie (of Owensboro, KY) met at the University of Kentucky have three children, Lilly, Molly, and Daniel.

== Head coaching record ==
Record table
Season	Team	Overall	Conference	Standing	Postseason
Eastern Kentucky Colonels (Ohio Valley Conference) (2015–2018)
2015–16	Eastern Kentucky	15–16	6–10	5th (East)	
2016–17	Eastern Kentucky	12–19	5–11	6th (East)	
2017–18	Eastern Kentucky	11–20	5–13	T–9th	
Eastern Kentucky:		38–55 (.409)	16–34 (.320)		
Total:		38–55 (.409)			
