= 2017–18 Eastern Kentucky Colonels men's basketball team =

American college basketball season

2017–18 Eastern Kentucky Colonels men's basketball
- Conference: Ohio Valley Conference
- Record: 11–20 (5–13 OVC)
- Head coach: Dan McHale (3rd season)
- Assistant coaches: Reece Gaines; Ryan Whalen; Terrence Commodore
- Home arena: McBrayer Arena

2017–18 Ohio Valley Conference men's basketball standings
	Conf.				Overall
Team	W		L	PCT	W		L	PCT
Murray State †	16	–	2	.889	26	–	6	.813
Belmont	15	–	3	.833	24	–	9	.727
Austin Peay	12	–	6	.667	19	–	15	.559
Jacksonville State	11	–	7	.611	23	–	13	.639
Tennessee Tech	10	–	8	.556	19	–	14	.576
Tennessee State	10	–	8	.556	15	–	15	.500
Southeast Missouri State*	8	–	10	.444	14	–	17	.452
Eastern Illinois	7	–	11	.389	12	–	19	.387
SIU Edwardsville	5	–	13	.278	9	–	21	.300
UT Martin	5	–	13	.278	10	–	21	.323
Eastern Kentucky	5	–	13	.278	11	–	20	.355
Morehead State	4	–	14	.222	8	–	21	.276
† 2018 OVC tournament winner *ineligible for postseason due to APR violations

The 2017–18 Eastern Kentucky Colonels men's basketball team represented Eastern Kentucky University during the 2017–18 NCAA Division I men's basketball season. The Colonels, led by third-year head coach Dan McHale, played their home games at McBrayer Arena within Alumni Coliseum in Richmond, Kentucky as members of the Ohio Valley Conference (OVC). They finished the season 11–20, 5–13 in OVC play, to finish in a three-way tie for ninth place. They failed to make the OVC tournament for the third consecutive season.

On February 26, 2018, the school fired Dan McHale as head coach after three seasons. He finished at EKU with a three-year record of 38–55. On March 23, NC State assistant A. W. Hamilton was hired as the new head coach of the Colonels.

== Previous season ==
The Colonels finished the season 12–19, 5–11 in OVC play, to finish in last place in the East Division. They failed to qualify for the OVC tournament.

== Preseason ==
In a vote of Ohio Valley Conference head men's basketball coaches and sports information directors, Eastern Kentucky was picked to finish fourth. Asante Gist was named to the preseason All-OVC team.

After five years of divisional play in the OVC, the conference eliminated divisions for the 2017–18 season. Additionally, for the first time, each conference team will play 18 conference games.

== Roster ==
2017–18 Eastern Kentucky Colonels men's basketball team
Players
Coaches

Pos.	#	Name	Height	Weight	Year	Hometown
G	0	Dujuanta Weaver	5 ft 10 in (1.78 m)	175 lb (79 kg)	RS So	Louisville, KY
G	1	JacQuess Hobbs	6 ft 2 in (1.88 m)	175 lb (79 kg)	Fr	Louisville, KY
F	2	DeAndre Dishman	6 ft 6 in (1.98 m)	215 lb (98 kg)	So	Lexington, KY
G/F	3	Peyton Broughton	6 ft 5 in (1.96 m)	195 lb (88 kg)	Fr	London, KY
G	4	Dillon Avare	6 ft 0 in (1.83 m)	160 lb (73 kg)	RS Sr	Lexington, KY
G	5	A.J. Youngman	6 ft 5 in (1.96 m)	195 lb (88 kg)	Fr	Peoria, IL
F	10	Nick Mayo	6 ft 9 in (2.06 m)	240 lb (109 kg)	Jr	Oakland, ME
G	11	Asante Gist	5 ft 11 in (1.8 m)	185 lb (84 kg)	So	East Orange, NJ
F	12	Zach Charles	6 ft 7 in (2.01 m)	210 lb (95 kg)	Sr	Mesquite, TX
F	13	Jackson Davis	6 ft 8 in (2.03 m)	220 lb (100 kg)	RS Jr	Lexington, KY
G	15	Kirkland Humphrey	6 ft 0 in (1.83 m)	170 lb (77 kg)	So	Richmond, KY
G	20	Dedric Boyd	6 ft 4 in (1.93 m)	175 lb (79 kg)	Fr	Brownsville, TN
F	21	Lachlan Anderson	6 ft 8 in (2.03 m)	190 lb (86 kg)	So	Sydney, Australia
G	23	Cameron Carmical	5 ft 10 in (1.78 m)	160 lb (73 kg)	Fr	Harlan, KY
G	25	Mason Cooper	6 ft 2 in (1.88 m)	175 lb (79 kg)	Fr	Fairfield, ME

Head coach

- Dan McHale (Kentucky)

Assistant coach(es)

- Reece Gaines (Louisville)
- Ryan Whalen (Saint Joseph's)
- Terrence Commodore (Eastern Kentucky)

Legend

- (C) Team captain
- (S) Suspended
- (I) Ineligible
- (W) Walk-on
- Injured
- Current redshirt

Roster
Last update: July 27, 2025

== Schedule and results ==
Date time, TV	Opponent	Result	Record	Site (attendance) city, state
Exhibition
November 3, 2017*; 7:00 p.m.	Georgetown College	W 91–69		McBrayer Arena (2,300); Richmond, KY
Non-conference regular season
November 10, 2017*; 8:00 p.m.	at Rice; MGM Resorts Main Event campus-site game	W 73–72	1–0	Tudor Fieldhouse (2,001); Houston, TX
November 13, 2017*; 6:30 p.m., SECN+	at Ole Miss; MGM Resorts Main Event campus-site game	L 75–85	1–1	The Pavilion at Ole Miss (7,042); Oxford, MS
November 16, 2017*; 7:00 p.m.	Kentucky State	W 97–66	2–1	McBrayer Arena (3,100); Richmond, KY
November 20, 2017*; 2:00 p.m.	vs. Prairie View A&M; MGM Resorts Main Event Middleweight semifinals	L 70–80	2–2	T-Mobile Arena; Paradise, NV
November 22, 2017*; 2:00 p.m.	vs. Eastern Washington; MGM Resorts Main Event Middleweight third-place game	L 62–83	2–3	T-Mobile Arena; Paradise, NV
November 25, 2017*; 5:00 p.m.	Asbury	W 99–71	3–3	McBrayer Arena (1,150); Richmond, KY
November 29, 2017*; 8:00 p.m., Stadium	at WKU	L 51–83	3–4	E.A. Diddle Arena (5,532); Bowling Green, KY
December 2, 2017*; 6:00 p.m.	Jacksonville	W 70–65 ^{OT}	4–4	McBrayer Arena (1,310); Richmond, KY
December 5, 2017*; 10:00 p.m., P12N	at Oregon State	L 62–74	4–5	Gill Coliseum (3,571); Corvallis, OR
December 10, 2017*; 6:00 p.m., CW Cincinnati	at Northern Kentucky	L 63–91	4–6	BB&T Arena (3,622); Highland Heights, KY
December 15, 2017*; 7:30 p.m.	at Charleston Southern	W 70–65	5–6	CSU Field House (556); North Charleston, SC
December 18, 2017*; 6:00 p.m.	Norfolk State	W 83–66	6–6	McBrayer Arena (1,210); Richmond, KY
December 22, 2017*; 7:00 p.m.	at Marshall	L 71–91	6–7	Cam Henderson Center (5,218); Huntington, WV
Ohio Valley Conference regular season
December 28, 2017; 8:30 p.m.	at Jacksonville State	L 58–76	6–8 (0–1)	Pete Mathews Coliseum (1,137); Jacksonville, AL
December 30, 2017; 7:00 p.m., CBSSN	at Tennessee Tech	L 69–77	6–9 (0–2)	Eblen Center (2,596); Cookeville, TN
January 4, 2018; 8:00 p.m.	SIU Edwardsville	L 82–85	6–10 (0–3)	McBrayer Arena (1,120); Richmond, KY
January 6, 2018; 4:00 p.m.	Eastern Illinois	L 53–54	6–11 (0–4)	McBrayer Arena (1,200); Richmond, KY
January 11, 2018; 8:30 p.m.	at UT Martin	W 78–70	7–11 (1–4)	Skyhawk Arena (1,576); Martin, TN
January 13, 2018; 5:15 p.m.	at Southeast Missouri State	W 91–86	8–11 (2–4)	Show Me Center (1,206); Cape Girardeau, MO
January 18, 2018; 8:00 p.m.	Tennessee Tech	L 67–70	8–12 (2–5)	McBrayer Arena (1,590); Richmond, KY
January 20, 2018; 7:00 p.m.	Jacksonville State	L 60–68	8–13 (2–6)	McBrayer Arena (60–68); Richmond, KY
January 25, 2018; 8:30 p.m.	at Austin Peay	L 84–90	8–14 (2–7)	Dunn Center (2,326); Clarksville, TN
January 27, 2018; 8:00 p.m.	at Murray State	L 73–88	8–15 (2–8)	CFSB Center (4,070); Murray, KY
February 1, 2018; 8:00 p.m.	Belmont	L 63–98	8–16 (2–9)	McBrayer Arena (1,620); Richmond, KY
February 3, 2018; 7:00 p.m.	Tennessee State	L 60–73	8–17 (2–10)	McBrayer Arena (1,680); Richmond, KY
February 8, 2018; 8:00 p.m.	UT Martin	L 69–70	8–18 (2–11)	McBrayer Arena (1,120); Richmond, KY
February 10, 2018; 7:00 p.m.	Morehead State	W 75–73	9–18 (3–11)	McBrayer Arena (2,620); Richmond, KY
February 15, 2018; 8:00 p.m.	at Belmont	L 73–84	9–19 (3–12)	Curb Event Center (2,812); Nashville, TN
February 17, 2018; 8:30 p.m.	at Tennessee State	W 72–59	10–19 (4–12)	Gentry Complex (2,255); Nashville, TN
February 22, 2018; 8:00 p.m.	Southeast Missouri State	W 91–88	11–19 (5–12)	McBrayer Arena (1,840); Richmond, KY
February 24, 2018; 2:00 p.m.	at Morehead State	L 66–70	11–20 (5–13)	Ellis Johnson Arena (3,947); Morehead, KY
*Non-conference game. ^{#}Rankings from AP poll. (#) Tournament seedings in parentheses. All times are in Eastern.
