= 2017–18 Jacksonville State Gamecocks men's basketball team =

American college basketball season

2017–18 Jacksonville State Gamecocks men's basketball

Cayman Islands Classic Mainland champion

CBI, semifinals
- Conference: Ohio Valley Conference
- Record: 23–13 (11–7 OVC)
- Head coach: Ray Harper (2nd season)
- Assistant coaches: Chase Richardson; Jake Morton; Tommy Wade
- Home arena: Pete Mathews Coliseum

2017–18 Ohio Valley Conference men's basketball standings
	Conf.				Overall
Team	W		L	PCT	W		L	PCT
Murray State †	16	–	2	.889	26	–	6	.813
Belmont	15	–	3	.833	24	–	9	.727
Austin Peay	12	–	6	.667	19	–	15	.559
Jacksonville State	11	–	7	.611	23	–	13	.639
Tennessee Tech	10	–	8	.556	19	–	14	.576
Tennessee State	10	–	8	.556	15	–	15	.500
Southeast Missouri State*	8	–	10	.444	14	–	17	.452
Eastern Illinois	7	–	11	.389	12	–	19	.387
SIU Edwardsville	5	–	13	.278	9	–	21	.300
UT Martin	5	–	13	.278	10	–	21	.323
Eastern Kentucky	5	–	13	.278	11	–	20	.355
Morehead State	4	–	14	.222	8	–	21	.276
† 2018 OVC tournament winner *ineligible for postseason due to APR violations

The 2017–18 Jacksonville State Gamecocks men's basketball team represented Jacksonville State University during the 2017–18 NCAA Division I men's basketball season. The Gamecocks, led by second-year head coach Ray Harper, played their home games at the Pete Mathews Coliseum in Jacksonville, Alabama as members of the Ohio Valley Conference (OVC). They finished the season 23–13, 11–7 in OVC play, to finish in fourth place. They defeated Tennessee Tech in the quarterfinals of the OVC tournament before losing in the semifinals to Murray State. They were invited to the College Basketball Invitational where they defeated Canisius and Central Arkansas to advance to the semifinals where they lost to North Texas.

== Previous season ==
The Gamecocks finished the 2016–17 season 20–15, 9–7 in OVC play, to finish in third place in the East Division. As the No. 4 seed in the OVC tournament, they defeated Southeast Missouri State, top-seeded Belmont and UT Martin to win the tournament title. As a result, they received the conference's automatic bid to the NCAA tournament, its first-ever appearance, where it lost in the first round to Louisville.

== Preseason ==
In a vote of conference coaches and sports information directors, Jacksonville State was picked to finish in 2nd place in the OVC. Malcolm Drumwright and Norbertas Giga were named to the 2017–18 preseason all-OVC men's basketball team.

After five years of divisional play in the OVC, the conference eliminated divisions for the 2017–18 season. Additionally, for the first time, each conference team played 18 conference games.

== Roster ==
2017–18 Jacksonville State Gamecocks men's basketball team
Players
Coaches

Pos.	#	Name	Height	Weight	Year	Hometown
G	0	Jamall Gregory	6 ft 3 in (1.91 m)	202 lb (92 kg)	Jr	Washington, D.C.
G	1	Maurice Dunlap	6 ft 2 in (1.88 m)	175 lb (79 kg)	Jr	Greenwood, MS
G/F	2	Mohamed Abuarisha	6 ft 7 in (2.01 m)	200 lb (91 kg)	So	Hadera, Israel
G/F	3	Tyrik Edwards	5 ft 10 in (1.78 m)	165 lb (75 kg)	So	Hopkinsville, KY
G	4	Deon Wright	6 ft 0 in (1.83 m)	165 lb (75 kg)	Jr	Oxford, AL
G	5	Des Curry	6 ft 0 in (1.83 m)	175 lb (79 kg)	RS Sr	Jacksonville, AL
F	11	Jacara Cross	6 ft 8 in (2.03 m)	240 lb (109 kg)	So	Lithonia, GA
F/C	12	Norbertas Giga	7 ft 0 in (2.13 m)	245 lb (111 kg)	Sr	Kaunas, Lithuania
G	13	Detrick Mostella	6 ft 1 in (1.85 m)	175 lb (79 kg)	Sr	Decatur, AL
F	14	Jason Burnell	6 ft 7 in (2.01 m)	220 lb (100 kg)	Jr	DeLand, FL
G	21	Malcolm Drumwright	6 ft 2 in (1.88 m)	185 lb (84 kg)	Sr	Rancho Cucamonga, CA
G	23	Marlon Hunter	6 ft 3 in (1.91 m)	195 lb (88 kg)	Jr	Memphis, TN
F	30	Cam Martin	6 ft 9 in (2.06 m)	230 lb (104 kg)	Fr	Pampa, TX
F	31	Christian Cunningham	6 ft 7 in (2.01 m)	215 lb (98 kg)	Jr	Albuquerque, NM
G	34	Ashton Spears	6 ft 2 in (1.88 m)	175 lb (79 kg)	So	Independence, LA
G/F	44	Ty Hudson	6 ft 1 in (1.85 m)	200 lb (91 kg)	Jr	Baton Rouge, LA

Head coach

- Ray Harper (Kentucky Wesleyan)

Assistant coach(es)

- Chase Richardson (Western Kentucky)
- Jake Morton (Miami (FL))
- Tommy Wade (Southeast Missouri State)

Legend

- (C) Team captain
- (S) Suspended
- (I) Ineligible
- (W) Walk-on
- Injured
- Current redshirt

Roster
Last update: August 23, 2024

== Schedule and results ==
Date time, TV	Rank^{#}	Opponent^{#}	Result	Record	Site (attendance) city, state
Exhibition
November 2, 2017*; 7:00 p.m.		Delta State	W 78–41		Pete Mathews Coliseum (547); Jacksonville, AL
Non-conference regular season
November 10, 2017*; 7:00 p.m.		Tennessee Wesleyan	W 100–42	1–0	Pete Mathews Coliseum (1,524); Jacksonville, AL
November 13, 2017*; 11:00 a.m., NBCSW		at Richmond; Cayman Islands Classic	W 91–64	2–0	Robins Center (6,805); Richmond, VA
November 15, 2017*; 6:00 p.m., ESPN3		at Buffalo; Cayman Islands Classic	L 76–81	2–1	Alumni Arena (2,319); Amherst, NY
November 20, 2017*; 4:00 p.m.		vs. Savannah State; Cayman Islands Classic Mainland semifinals	W 86–71	3–1	McKenzie Arena (2,332); Chattanooga, TN
November 21, 2017*; 7:30 p.m., ESPN3		vs. Chattanooga; Cayman Islands Classic Mainland finals	W 77–75 ^{OT}	4–1	McKenzie Arena (2,211); Chattanooga, TN
November 26, 2017*; 2:00 p.m., SECN+		at Mississippi State	L 56–59	4–2	Humphrey Coliseum (6,034); Starkville, MS
November 30, 2017*; 7:00 p.m.		Alabama State	W 77–69	5–2	Pete Mathews Coliseum (1,769); Jacksonville, AL
December 3, 2017*; 2:00 p.m.		Samford	W 89–58	6–2	Pete Mathews Coliseum (2,018); Jacksonville, AL
December 9, 2017*; 1:00 p.m.		Louisiana–Monroe	W 75–56	7–2	Pete Mathews Coliseum (1,154); Jacksonville, AL
December 12, 2017*; 9:00 p.m., P12N		at Oregon State	L 69–70	7–3	Gill Coliseum (3,900); Corvallis, OR
December 16, 2017*; 3:00 p.m.		USC Upstate	W 77–61	8–3	Pete Mathews Coliseum (1,222); Jacksonville, AL
December 18, 2017*; 7:00 p.m.		Howard	W 62–60	9–3	Pete Mathews Coliseum (1,008); Jacksonville, AL
December 21, 2017*; 12:00 p.m.		Chattanooga	L 67–70	9–4	Pete Mathews Coliseum (1,002); Jacksonville, AL
Ohio Valley Conference regular season
December 28, 2017; 7:30 p.m.		Eastern Kentucky	W 76–58	10–4 (1–10)	Pete Mathews Coliseum (1,137); Jacksonville, AL
December 30, 2017; 4:30 p.m.		Morehead State	W 76–69	11–4 (2–0)	Pete Mathews Coliseum (1,011); Jacksonville, AL
January 4, 2018; 7:30 p.m.		at Tennessee State	L 60–67	11–5 (2–1)	Gentry Complex (831); Nashville, TN
January 6, 2018; 5:00 p.m.		at Belmont	W 64–60	12–5 (3–1)	Curb Event Center (1,789); Nashville, TN
January 11, 2018; 7:30 p.m.		Murray State	W 76–71	13–5 (4–1)	Pete Mathews Coliseum (3,004); Jacksonville, AL
January 13, 2018; 4:30 p.m.		Austin Peay	L 67–87	13–6 (4–2)	Pete Mathews Coliseum (1,933); Jacksonville, AL
January 18, 2018; 6:00 p.m., CBSSN		at Morehead State	W 58–57	14–6 (5–2)	Ellis Johnson Arena (3,673); Morehead, KY
January 20, 2018; 6:00 p.m.		at Eastern Kentucky	W 68–60	15–6 (6–2)	McBrayer Arena (1,610); Richmond, KY
January 25, 2018; 7:30 p.m.		UT Martin	L 63–67	15–7 (6–3)	Pete Mathews Coliseum (1,482); Jacksonville, AL
January 27, 2018; 7:00 p.m.		Southeast Missouri State	W 78–60	16–7 (7–3)	Pete Mathews Coliseum (2,688); Jacksonville, AL
February 1, 2018; 7:30 p.m.		at Eastern Illinois	W 75–56	17–7 (8–3)	Lantz Arena (1,643); Charleston, IL
February 3, 2018; 1:00 p.m.		at SIU Edwardsville	L 67–75	17–8 (8–4)	Vadalabene Center (1,507); Edwardsville, IL
February 8, 2018; 8:00 p.m., ESPNU		Tennessee Tech	W 82–65	18–8 (9–4)	Pete Mathews Coliseum (2,009); Jacksonville, AL
February 10, 2018; 7:00 p.m.		Tennessee State	L 47–65	18–9 (9–5)	Pete Mathews Coliseum (1,876); Jacksonville, AL
February 15, 2018; 7:00 p.m.		at Murray State	L 60–68	18–10 (9–6)	CFSB Center (3,902); Murray, KY
February 17, 2018; 7:00 p.m.		at Austin Peay	L 57–60	18–11 (9–7)	Dunn Center (2,353); Clarksville, TN
February 22, 2018; 8:00 p.m., ESPNU		Belmont	W 78–67	19–11 (10–7)	Pete Mathews Coliseum (2,393); Jacksonville, AL
February 24, 2018; 7:30 p.m.		at Tennessee Tech	W 66–57	20–11 (11–7)	Eblen Center (2,757); Cookeville, TN
Ohio Valley Conference tournament
March 1, 2018; 6:30 p.m.	(4)	vs. (5) Tennessee Tech; Quarterfinals	W 73–70	21–11	Ford Center (914); Evansville, IN
March 2, 2018; 7:00 p.m., ESPNU	(4)	vs. (1) Murray State; Semifinals	L 63–70	21–12	Ford Center (3,403); Evansville, IN
CBI
March 14, 2018*; 6:00 p.m., ESPN3		at Canisius; First round	W 80–78 ^{OT}	22–12	Koessler Athletic Center (870); Buffalo, NY
March 15, 2018*; 7:00 p.m.		at Central Arkansas; Quarterfinals	W 80–59	23–12	Farris Center (2,570); Conway, AR
March 21, 2018*; 7:00 p.m., ESPN3		at North Texas; Semifinals	L 68–90	23–13	The Super Pit (2,784); Denton, TX
*Non-conference game. ^{#}Rankings from AP poll. (#) Tournament seedings in parentheses. All times are in Central.
