= 2017–18 Tennessee State Tigers basketball team =

American college basketball season

2017–18 Tennessee State Tigers basketball
- Conference: Ohio Valley Conference
- Record: 15–15 (10–8 OVC)
- Head coach: Dana Ford (4th season)
- Assistant coaches: Randy Peele; Rodney Hamilton; Pierre Jordan
- Home arena: Gentry Complex

2017–18 Ohio Valley Conference men's basketball standings
	Conf.				Overall
Team	W		L	PCT	W		L	PCT
Murray State †	16	–	2	.889	26	–	6	.813
Belmont	15	–	3	.833	24	–	9	.727
Austin Peay	12	–	6	.667	19	–	15	.559
Jacksonville State	11	–	7	.611	23	–	13	.639
Tennessee Tech	10	–	8	.556	19	–	14	.576
Tennessee State	10	–	8	.556	15	–	15	.500
Southeast Missouri State*	8	–	10	.444	14	–	17	.452
Eastern Illinois	7	–	11	.389	12	–	19	.387
SIU Edwardsville	5	–	13	.278	9	–	21	.300
UT Martin	5	–	13	.278	10	–	21	.323
Eastern Kentucky	5	–	13	.278	11	–	20	.355
Morehead State	4	–	14	.222	8	–	21	.276
† 2018 OVC tournament winner *ineligible for postseason due to APR violations

The 2017–18 Tennessee State Tigers basketball team represented Tennessee State University during the 2017–18 NCAA Division I men's basketball season. The Tigers, led by fourth-year head coach Dana Ford, played their home games at the Gentry Complex in Nashville, Tennessee as members of the Ohio Valley Conference. They finished the season 15–15, 10–8 in OVC play to finish in a tie for fifth place. They lost in the first round of the OVC tournament to Eastern Illinois.

On March 21, 2018, head coach Dana Ford left Tennessee State for the head coaching job at Missouri State. He finished at Tennessee State with a four-year record of 57–65. On March 26, the school announced that former Illinois State assistant coach Brian Collins had been hired as head coach.

== Previous season ==
The Tigers finished the 2016–17 season 17–13, 8–8 in OVC play to finish in a tie for fourth place in the East Division. As the No. 8 seed in the OVC tournament, they lost to Southeast Missouri State in the first round.

== Preseason ==
In a vote of conference coaches and sports information directors, Tennessee State was picked to finish in 7th place in the OVC.

After five years of divisional play in the OVC, the conference eliminated divisions for the 2017–18 season. Additionally, for the first time, each conference team will play 18 conference games.

== Roster ==
2017–18 Tennessee State Tigers men's basketball team
Players
Coaches

Pos.	#	Name	Height	Weight	Year	Hometown
G	0	Armani Chaney	5 ft 10 in (1.78 m)	165 lb (75 kg)	Jr	Chicago, Illinois
G	1	Delano Spencer	6 ft 3 in (1.91 m)	200 lb (91 kg)	Sr	Atlanta, Georgia
G	2	Kamar McKnight	6 ft 4 in (1.93 m)	205 lb (93 kg)	RS So	Toronto, Ontario, Canada
G	3	Donte Fitzpatrick-Dorsey	6 ft 4 in (1.93 m)	191 lb (87 kg)	RS Jr	Memphis, Tennessee
F/C	4	Ken'Darrius Hamilton	6 ft 9 in (2.06 m)	245 lb (111 kg)	Sr	Montgomery, Alabama
G	5	David Morris	6 ft 1 in (1.85 m)	175 lb (79 kg)	RS Fr	Erie, Pennsylvania
G	10	Tripp Davis	6 ft 3 in (1.91 m)	175 lb (79 kg)	RS So	Nashville, Tennessee
G/F	11	A.C. Reid	6 ft 5 in (1.96 m)	215 lb (98 kg)	RS Sr	San Antonio, Texas
F	12	Hampus Ahlin	6 ft 6 in (1.98 m)	215 lb (98 kg)	Jr	Stockholm, Sweden
F	13	Samson Oyediran	6 ft 7 in (2.01 m)	211 lb (96 kg)	RS Jr	London, England
G	14	Darreon Reddick	6 ft 4 in (1.93 m)	195 lb (88 kg)	Sr	Belleville, Illinois
F	21	Christian Mekowulu	6 ft 9 in (2.06 m)	245 lb (111 kg)	RS Jr	Lagos, Nigeria
G/F	22	Daniel Cummings	6 ft 5 in (1.96 m)	210 lb (95 kg)	RS Fr	Toronto, Ontario, Canada
F	23	DaJion Henderson	6 ft 7 in (2.01 m)	275 lb (125 kg)	Jr	Los Angeles, California
F	30	Stokley Chaffee, Jr.	6 ft 8 in (2.03 m)	215 lb (98 kg)	RS Jr	Oakland, California
G	34	Jalen Duke	6 ft 5 in (1.96 m)	213 lb (97 kg)	RS So	Nashville, Tennessee

Head coach

- Dana Ford (Illinois State)

Assistant coach(es)

- Randy Peele (Virginia Wesleyan)
- Rodney Hamilton (Georgia State)
- Pierre Jordan (Georgia Tech)

Legend

- (C) Team captain
- (S) Suspended
- (I) Ineligible
- (W) Walk-on
- Injured
- Current redshirt

Roster
Last update: November 9, 2017

== Schedule and results ==
Date time, TV	Rank^{#}	Opponent^{#}	Result	Record	Site (attendance) city, state
Non-conference regular season
Nov 10, 2017*; 8:00 pm, ESPNU		at No. 4 Kansas	L 56–92	0–1	Allen Fieldhouse (16,300); Lawrence, KS
Nov 13, 2017*; 7:00 pm		Reinhardt	W 92–53	1–1	Gentry Complex (1,601); Nashville, TN
Nov 18, 2017*; 3:00 pm		Middle Tennessee	L 65–75	1–2	Gentry Complex (1,850); Nashville, TN
Nov 21, 2017*; 7:00 pm		Canisius	W 60–52	2–2	Gentry Complex (807); Nashville, TN
Nov 25, 2017*; 6:00 pm, ESPN3		at Kennesaw State	W 77–74 ^{OT}	3–2	KSU Convocation Center (771); Kennesaw, GA
Nov 28, 2017*; 7:00 pm		Fisk	W 67–53	4–2	Gentry Complex (2,511); Nashville, TN
Dec 2, 2017*; 7:00 pm		Lipscomb	L 86–95 ^{OT}	4–3	Gentry Complex (1,201); Nashville, TN
Dec 12, 2017*; 7:00 pm		at Alabama State	W 64–45	5–3	Dunn–Oliver Acadome (362); Montgomery, AL
Dec 15, 2017*; 6:00 pm		at North Carolina A&T	L 54–64	5–4	Corbett Sports Center (520); Greensboro, NC
Dec 18, 2017*; 8:00 pm, ESPN2		at Texas	L 46–47	5–5	Frank Erwin Center (8,218); Austin, TX
Dec 21, 2017*; 5:00 pm, BTN		at No. 16 Purdue	L 48–97	5–6	Mackey Arena (12,679); West Lafayette, IN
Ohio Valley Conference regular season
Dec 28, 2017; 6:00 pm, CBSSN		at UT Martin	L 60–63 ^{OT}	5–7 (0–1)	Skyhawk Arena (2,009); Martin, TN
Dec 31, 2017; 1:00 pm		at Southeast Missouri State	L 65–77	5–8 (0–2)	Show Me Center (615); Cape Girardeau, MO
Jan 4, 2018; 7:30 pm		Jacksonville State	W 67–60	6–8 (1–2)	Gentry Complex (831); Nashville, TN
Jan 6, 2018; 4:00 pm		Tennessee Tech	L 81–87	6–9 (1–3)	Gentry Complex (1,127); Nashville, TN
Jan 11, 2018; 6:00 pm, CBSSN		at Eastern Illinois	W 69–65	7–9 (2–3)	Lantz Arena (1,313); Charleston, IL
Jan 13, 2018; 7:00 pm		at SIU Edwardsville	L 79–82	7–10 (2–4)	Vadalabene Center (1,346); Edwardsville, IL
Jan 18, 2018; 7:30 pm		Austin Peay	W 70–56	8–10 (3–4)	Gentry Complex (1,301); Nashville, TN
Jan 20, 2018; 7:30 pm		Murray State	L 57–76	8–11 (3–5)	Gentry Complex (2,611); Nashville, TN
Jan 25, 2018; 7:30 pm		SIU Edwardsville	W 85–57	9–11 (4–5)	Gentry Complex (1,291); Nashville, TN
Jan 27, 2018; 7:30 pm		Eastern Illinois	W 50–47	10–11 (5–5)	Gentry Complex (1,344); Nashville, TN
Feb 1, 2018; 6:30 pm		at Morehead State	W 61–58	11–11 (6–5)	Ellis Johnson Arena (2,237); Morehead, KY
Feb 3, 2018; 6:00 pm		at Eastern Kentucky	W 73–60	12–11 (7–5)	McBrayer Arena (1,680); Richmond, KY
Feb 8, 2018; 7:30 pm		Belmont	W 64–56	13–11 (8–5)	Gentry Complex (5,411); Nashville, TN
Feb 10, 2018; 7:00 pm		at Jacksonville State	W 65–48	14–11 (9–5)	Pete Mathews Coliseum (1,876); Jacksonville, AL
Feb 15, 2018; 7:30 pm		Morehead State	W 83–74	15–11 (10–5)	Gentry Complex (2,511); Nashville, TN
Feb 17, 2018; 7:30 pm		Eastern Kentucky	L 59–72	15–12 (10–6)	Gentry Complex (2,255); Nashville, TN
Feb 22, 2018; 7:30 pm		at Tennessee Tech	L 64–69	15–13 (10–7)	Eblen Center (2,659); Cookeville, TN
Feb 24, 2018; 5:00 pm		at Belmont	L 59–84	15–14 (10–8)	Curb Event Center (5,074); Nashville, TN
Ohio Valley Conference tournament
Feb 28, 2018; 9:00 pm	(6)	vs. (7) Eastern Illinois; First round	L 71–73	15–15	Ford Center (654); Evansville, IN
*Non-conference game. ^{#}Rankings from AP Poll. (#) Tournament seedings in parentheses. All times are in Central Time.
