= Matt McMahon (basketball) =

American basketball coach (born 1978)

Biographical details
- Born: April 26, 1978 (age 48); Oak Ridge, Tennessee, U.S.

Playing career
- 1996–2000: Appalachian State
- Position: Shooting guard

Coaching career (HC unless noted)
- 2000–2001: Appalachian State (student asst.)
- 2001–2002: Tennessee (GA)
- 2002–2010: Appalachian State (assistant)
- 2010–2011: UNC Wilmington (assistant)
- 2011–2015: Murray State (assistant)
- 2015–2022: Murray State
- 2022–2026: LSU

Head coaching record
- Overall: 213–137 (.609)
- Tournaments: 2–3 (NCAA Division I); 0–1 (NIT)

Accomplishments and honors

Championships
- 3 OVC tournament (2018, 2019, 2022); 4 OVC regular season (2018–2020, 2022); OVC West division (2016)

Awards
- OVC Coach of the Year (2022)

Matthew Joseph McMahon (born April 26, 1978) is an American basketball coach who most recently served as the head men's college basketball head coach for LSU. He previously served as the head coach at Murray State. In his third year leading the program, McMahon led the Racers to a 26–6 record that included Ohio Valley Conference regular-season and tournament championships. He played college basketball at Appalachian State University.

== Playing career ==
=== Oak Ridge High School ===
McMahon played high school basketball at Oak Ridge High School in Oak Ridge, Tennessee.

=== Appalachian State ===
A 6-foot-1 shooting guard, McMahon was a regular player under head coach Buzz Peterson at Appalachian State from 1996 to 2000. The Mountaineers posted a 65–25 record over his last three years, finishing with an NCAA Tournament appearance in 2000. During those years, McMahon averaged 6.9 points in 90 games, hitting 37.5 percent (124 of 331) of his 3-point attempts. He graduated in 2000 with a bachelor's degree in marketing.

== Coaching career ==
=== Appalachian State (first stint) ===
After his playing career, McMahon stayed on at Appalachian State as a student assistant men's basketball coach under head coach Houston Fancher in 2000–01.

=== Tennessee ===
McMahon then rejoined his former coach Buzz Peterson for a season as a graduate assistant coach at Tennessee from 2001 to 2002.

=== Appalachian State (second stint) ===
Following his year at Tennessee, McMahon returned to Appalachian State in 2002 as a full-time assistant under Fancher. He remained there through the end of the 2009–2010 season.

=== UNC Wilmington ===
In 2010, McMahon again joined Peterson, this time as an assistant at UNC-Wilmington, before then joining Steve Prohm's staff at Murray State as assistant coach in 2011.

=== Murray State ===
At Murray State under Prohm, McMahon helped guide the Racers to 104 victories in four years, including appearances in the 2012 NCAA tournament, the 2015 National Invitation Tournament, and the 2014 CollegeInsider.com Postseason Tournament, where the Racers won the tournament championship.

In 2012, FoxSports.com and CollegeInsider.com ranked McMahon as one of college basketball's best assistant coaches, while in 2015 he was tabbed as one of "9 Under-the-Radar Coaches to Watch" by NCAA.com.

McMahon was hired as an assistant to Eric Konkol at Louisiana Tech on May 27, 2015. He held this role for only a few weeks, as on June 10, 2015, McMahon returned to Murray State to become head coach of the Racers. He replaced Prohm, who left to take the head coach position at Iowa State University.

"I am so excited to know that Coach McMahon will be returning to Murray State to lead the Racers," Murray State athletic director Allen Ward said. "After watching him for four years, I'm convinced he's the right man for the job. He's an outstanding coach, nationally recognized as one of the top assistants in the country, with a tremendous upside. Matt has the talent and integrity to continue the momentum we've built, put his own stamp on the program, and meet the expectations that come with being the head coach at Murray State."

McMahon's third Racer team posted a 26–6 record, winning Ohio Valley Conference regular-season and tournament championships. They were awarded a 12 seed in the 2018 NCAA tournament, where they fell in the first round to West Virginia, 85–68. After the season, he was named National Association of Basketball Coaches District 19 Coach of the Year.

In his fourth year with the Racers he led future No. 2 NBA Draft pick Ja Morant and his teammates to their second straight OVC title, after sharing the regular season title with Belmont. The team upset Markus Howard and Marquette in the Round of 64, before falling to Florida State in the NCAA Tournament. The team would finish the season with a 28–5 overall record, while going 16–2 in conference play.

On April 5, 2019, McMahon was awarded a four-year contract extension which would have kept him at Murray State through the 2022–23 season had he not accepted a job at Louisiana State University in March 2022. McMahon's salary was increased from $300,000 a year to $500,000 a year.

Following the close of the 2021–22 season, McMahon was named the OVC Coach of the Year. This was after McMahon guided the Racers to a 31–3 overall record, including going undefeated in the OVC at 18–0, winning both the OVC regular season and tournament championships, and reaching the NCAA Tournament Round of 32.

=== LSU ===
On March 21, 2022, McMahon was announced as the new men's basketball head coach at LSU, agreeing to a 7-year deal to replace Will Wade who had been fired due to allegations of NCAA violations.

McMahon's LSU teams did not perform well, finishing in 14th, seventh, 15th, and last place in the SEC in his four seasons.

On March 26, 2026, McMahon was fired as the Tigers' head coach after four seasons and a 60–70 overall record. He was fired to allow for the return of Will Wade as LSU's coach whom McMahon had replaced in 2022.

== Head coaching record ==
Record table
Season	Team	Overall	Conference	Standing	Postseason
Murray State Racers (Ohio Valley Conference) (2015–2022)
2015–16	Murray State	16–14	10–6	T–1st (West)	
2016–17	Murray State	16–17	8–8	3rd (West)	
2017–18	Murray State	26–6	16–2	1st	NCAA Division I Round of 64
2018–19	Murray State	28–5	16–2	T–1st	NCAA Division I Round of 32
2019–20	Murray State	23–9	15–3	T–1st	No postseason held
2020–21	Murray State	13–13	10–10	T–5th	
2021–22	Murray State	31–3	18–0	1st	NCAA Division I Round of 32
Murray State:		153–67 (.695)	93–31 (.750)		
LSU Tigers (Southeastern Conference) (2022–2026)
2022–23	LSU	14–19	2–16	14th	
2023–24	LSU	17–16	9–9	T–7th	NIT First Round
2024–25	LSU	14–18	3–15	15th	
2025–26	LSU	15–17	3–15	16th	
LSU:		60–70 (.462)	17–55 (.236)		
Total:		213–137 (.609)			
National champion Postseason invitational champion Conference regular season champion Conference regular season and conference tournament champion Division regular season champion Division regular season and conference tournament champion Conference tournament champion
