= 2017–18 SIU Edwardsville Cougars men's basketball team =

American college basketball season

2017–18 SIU Edwardsville Cougars men's basketball
- Conference: Ohio Valley Conference
- Record: 9–21 (5–13 OVC)
- Head coach: Jon Harris (3rd season)
- Assistant coaches: Bubba Wells; Brian Barone; Tarrance Crump; Yemi Makanjuola (GA)
- Home arena: Vadalabene Center

2017–18 Ohio Valley Conference men's basketball standings
	Conf.				Overall
Team	W		L	PCT	W		L	PCT
Murray State †	16	–	2	.889	26	–	6	.813
Belmont	15	–	3	.833	24	–	9	.727
Austin Peay	12	–	6	.667	19	–	15	.559
Jacksonville State	11	–	7	.611	23	–	13	.639
Tennessee Tech	10	–	8	.556	19	–	14	.576
Tennessee State	10	–	8	.556	15	–	15	.500
Southeast Missouri State*	8	–	10	.444	14	–	17	.452
Eastern Illinois	7	–	11	.389	12	–	19	.387
SIU Edwardsville	5	–	13	.278	9	–	21	.300
UT Martin	5	–	13	.278	10	–	21	.323
Eastern Kentucky	5	–	13	.278	11	–	20	.355
Morehead State	4	–	14	.222	8	–	21	.276
† 2018 OVC tournament winner *ineligible for postseason due to APR violations

The 2017–18 SIU Edwardsville Cougars men's basketball team represented Southern Illinois University Edwardsville during the 2017–18 NCAA Division I men's basketball season. The Cougars, led by third year head coach Jon Harris, played their home games at the Vadalabene Center in Edwardsville, Illinois as members of the Ohio Valley Conference. They finished the season 9–21, 5–13 in OVC play to finish in a three-way tie for ninth place. Due to Southeast Missouri State being ineligible for postseason play due to APR violations, the Cougars received the No. 8 seed in the OVC tournament where they lost in the first round to Tennessee Tech.

== Previous season ==
The Cougars finished the 2016–17 season 6–24, 1–15 in OVC play to finish in last place in the West Division. They failed to qualify for the OVC tournament.

== Preseason ==
In a vote of conference coaches and sports information directors, SIUE was picked to finish in 12th place in the OVC.

After five years of divisional play in the OVC, the conference eliminated divisions for the 2017–18 season. Additionally, for the first time, each conference team will play 18 conference games.

== Season summary ==
The Cougars finished the regular season with nine wins and twenty losses, an improvement over the two preceding seasons. Their conference record of 5–12 placed them in a tie for ninth place in the conference standings.

=== Postseason ===
The Cougars' ninth place tie was broken by their 2–1 record versus Eastern Kentucky and UT Martin. With Southeast Missouri ineligible for post season play, the Cougars earned the No. 8 seed in the OVC tournament, the schools' first slot in the tournament since 2015.

=== Awards and honors ===
Prior to the start of the OVC Tournament, the conference announced the Cougars senior forward Jalen Henry was named to the All-OVC Second Team.

On March 27, the Ohio Valley Conference announced that the SIUE men's team are the recipients of the 2017-18 OVC Team Sportsmanship Award for men's basketball.

== Roster ==
2017–18 SIU Edwardsville Cougars men's basketball team
Players
Coaches

Pos.	#	Name	Height	Weight	Year	Previous school	Hometown
F	1	D.J. Jackson	6 ft 5 in (1.96 m)	190 lb (86 kg)	Fr	Fayette Ware	Moscow, TN
G	2	D'Quan Applewhite (xW)	6 ft 3 in (1.91 m)	180 lb (82 kg)	Jr	Thornton	Harvey, IL
G	3	Daniel Kinchen	6 ft 3 in (1.91 m)	155 lb (70 kg)	Jr	Alabama Southern CC/Stephenson	Atlanta, GA
G	5	Kevion Stewart	6 ft 3 in (1.91 m)	185 lb (84 kg)	RS Fr	Cordova	Memphis, TN
F	10	Bill Awet	6 ft 8 in (2.03 m)	200 lb (91 kg)	RS Fr	Victory Rock Prep	Sydney, Australia
G	13	Christian Ellis	6 ft 2 in (1.88 m)	190 lb (86 kg)	So	Modesto Christian	Oakland, CA
G	15	David McFarland	6 ft 4 in (1.93 m)	180 lb (82 kg)	Jr	East Mississippi CC/Raymond	Edwards, MS
G	22	Justin Benton	6 ft 4 in (1.93 m)	180 lb (82 kg)	So	Houston	Memphis, TN
F	24	Jalen Henry	6 ft 8 in (2.03 m)	220 lb (100 kg)	Sr	Southeast	Springfield, IL
G	25	Jaylen McCoy	5 ft 11 in (1.8 m)	180 lb (82 kg)	Jr	Wallace State CC/Saint James School	Montgomery, AL
F	32	Brandon Jackson	6 ft 7 in (2.01 m)	215 lb (98 kg)	So	Cardinal Ritter	East St. Louis, IL
F/C	34	Julian Torres†	6 ft 9 in (2.06 m)	255 lb (116 kg)	RS So	UIC/Bolingbrook	Bolingbrook, IL
F	45	Keenan Simmons	6 ft 6 in (1.98 m)	210 lb (95 kg)	Sr	Michigan City	Michigan City, IN
		† = left team at holiday/semester break	—	—

Head coach

- Jon Harris

Assistant coach(es)

- Bubba Wells
- Brian Barone
- Tarrance Crump
- Yemi Makanjuola (GA)

Legend

- (C) Team captain
- (S) Suspended
- (I) Ineligible
- (W) Walk-on
- Injured
- Current redshirt

Roster
Last update: 4 January 2018

== Schedule and results ==
Date time, TV	Rank^{#}	Opponent^{#}	Result	Record	High points	High rebounds	High assists	Site (attendance) city, state
Exhibition
Nov 5, 2017*; 2:00 pm, OVCDN		Brescia	W 95–75	—	19 – Henry	8 – Simmons, Torres & Team	10 – Benton	Vadalabene Center (1,059); Edwardsville, IL
Non-conference regular season
Nov 10, 2017*; 7:00 pm, BTN Plus		at No. 20 Purdue	L 74–105	0–1	20 – Torres	7 – Ellis	6 – Benton	Mackey Arena (13,934); West Lafayette, IN
Nov 15, 2017*; 7:00 pm, FSMW/OVCDN		Valparaiso	L 69–94	0–2	21 – Henry & Kinchen	9 – Henry	5 – Benton	Vadalabene Center (1,353); Edwardsville, IL
Nov 18, 2017*; 12:00 pm, ESPN3		at Stetson	W 80–76	1–2	23 – Kinchen	13 – Henry	5 – Kinchen	Edmunds Center (475); DeLand, FL
Nov 22, 2017*; 7:00 pm, OVCDN		Western Illinois	L 67–69	1–3	26 – Kinchen	8 – Henry	4 – Henry	Vadalabene Center (1,126); Edwardsville, IL
Nov 25, 2017*; 3:30 pm, FS2		at Creighton	L 66–103	1–4	19 – Ellis & Henry	9 – Henry	2 – McFarland & Stewart	CenturyLink Center Omaha (15,607); Omaha, NE
Nov 29, 2017*; 7:00 pm, ESPN3		at Southern Illinois	L 59–86	1–5	16 – Ellis	11 – Henry	3 – Ellis	SIU Arena (3,333); Carbondale, IL
Dec 3, 2017*; 1:00 pm, Mastodons All-Access		at Fort Wayne	L 71–86	1–6	16 – Henry & McCoy	5 – Awet	6 – Ellis	Memorial Coliseum (1,315); Fort Wayne, IN
Dec 6, 2017*; 6:00 pm, ESPN3		at IUPUI	W 82–81	2–6	21 – Henry	9 – Henry	4 – Ellis	Indiana Farmers Coliseum (809); Indianapolis, IN
Dec 10, 2017*; 2:00 pm, FSMW/OVCDN		South Alabama	W 76–75	3–6	26 – Henry	12 – Henry	5 – Ellis	Vadalabene Center (1,155); Edwardsville, IL
Dec 19, 2017*; 7:00 pm, FSMW/OVCDN		Chicago State	W 88–76	4–6	19 – Ellis & Henry	6 – Henry	8 – Ellis	Vadalabene Center (1,005); Edwardsville, IL
Dec 22, 2017*; 6:00 pm, ESPN3		at Central Michigan	L 52–70	4–7	14 – Ellis	8 – Ellis	5 – Ellis	McGuirk Arena (1,664); Mount Pleasant, MI
Ohio Valley Conference regular season
Dec 28, 2017; 7:00 pm, OVCDN		at Austin Peay	L 58–78	4–8 (0–1)	14 – Benton	6 – Benton, Ellis & D, Jackson	5 – Kinchen	Dunn Center (1,648); Clarksville, TN
Dec 30, 2017; 7:00 pm, OVCDN		at Murray State	L 63–87	4–9 (0–2)	13 – Kinchen	6 – B.Jackson	3 – Kinchen	CFSB Center (2,986); Murray, KY
Jan 4, 2018; 7:00 pm, OVCDN		at Eastern Kentucky	W 85–82	5–9 (1–2)	35 – Henry	7 – McFarland	5 – Benton	McBrayer Arena (1,120); Richmond, KY
Jan 6, 2018; 3:15 pm, OVCDN		at Morehead State	W 70–65	6–9 (2–2)	16 – Henry	11 – Henry	8 – Kinchen	Ellis Johnson Arena (1,442); Morehead, KY
Jan 11, 2018; 7:00 pm, FSMW/OVCDN		Belmont	L 61–76	6–10 (2–3)	14 – Kinchen	8 – Ellis	3 – Bentom & Ellis	Vadalabene Center (1,165); Edwardsville, IL
Jan 13, 2018; 7:00 pm, OVCDN		Tennessee State	W 82–79	7–10 (3–3)	19 – B. Jackson	7 – B. Jackson	9 – Ellis	Vadalabene Center (1,346); Edwardsville, IL
Jan 18, 2018; 7:00 pm, OVCDN		Southeast Missouri State	L 74–86	7–11 (3–4)	22 – McFarland	9 – McFarland	5 – Bentom & Ellis	Vadalabene Center (1,147); Edwardsville, IL
Jan 20, 2018; 1:00 pm, FSMW/OVCDN		UT Martin	L 69–70	7–12 (3–5)	21 – Henry	6 – McFarland & Simmons	5 – Bentom & Ellis	Vadalabene Center (1,234); Edwardsville, IL
Jan 25, 2018; 7:30 pm, OVCDN		at Tennessee State	L 57–85	7–13 (3–6)	11 – Ellis, Henry & McFarland	9 – Ellis	3 – Ellis & McFarland	Gentry Complex (1,291); Nashville, TN
Jan 27, 2018; 5:00 pm, OVCDN		at Belmont	L 72–83	7–14 (3–7)	17 – Henry	5 – B.Jackson	2 – Benton, Ellis & McFarland	Curb Event Center (2,454); Nashville, TN
Feb 1, 2018; 7:00 pm, OVCDN		Tennessee Tech	L 67–68	7–15 (3–8)	27 – Ellis	12 – McFarland	5 – Kinchen	Vadalabene Center (1,153); Edwardsville, IL
Feb 3, 2018; 1:00 pm, FSMW/OVCDN		Jacksonville State	W 75–67	9–15 (4–8)	15 – McFarland	8 – Team	5 – Ellis	Vadalabene Center (1,507); Edwardsville, IL
Feb 8, 2018; 7:00 pm, OVCDN		Eastern Illinois	L 74–78	8–16 (4–9)	21 – Kinchen	10 – Simmons	4 – Benton & Ellis	Vadalabene Center (1,205); Edwardsville, IL
Feb 10, 2018; 1:00 pm, FSMW/OVCDN		Murray State	L 66–75	8–17 (4–10)	18 – Henry	10 – Simmons & Team	4 – McFarland	Vadalabene Center (1,517); Edwardsville, IL
Feb 15, 2018; 7:00 pm, FSMW/OVCDN		at UT Martin	W 70–69	9–17 (5–10)	25 – Simmons	8 – Simmons	4 – Ellis	Skyhawk Arena (1,001); Martin, TN
Feb 17, 2018; 4:15 pm, OVCDN		at Southeast Missouri State	L 74–79	9–18 (5–11)	19 – Ellis	9 – Simmons	4 – Kinchen	Show Me Center (1,697); Cape Girardeau, MO
Feb 22, 2018; 7:00 pm, FSMW/OVCDN		Austin Peay	L 82–86	9–19 (5–12)	26 – Henry	7 – Henry	3 – Benton, Henry & Kinchen	Vadalabene Center (1,583); Edwardsville, IL
Feb 24, 2018; 3:15 pm, OVCDN		at Eastern Illinois	L 56–68	9–20 (5–13)	20 – Henry	11 – Simmons	3 – McFarland	Lantz Arena (1,550); Charleston, IL
Ohio Valley Conference tournament
Feb 28, 2018; 6:30 pm, OVCDN	(8)	vs. (5) Tennessee Tech; First Round	L 51–60	9–21	14 – Henry	15 – Henry	4 – Benton	Ford Center (654); Evansville, IN
*Non-conference game. ^{#}Rankings from AP Poll. (#) Tournament seedings in parentheses. All times are in Central Time Source.
