= 2017–18 Austin Peay Governors basketball team =

American college basketball season

2017–18 Austin Peay Governors men's basketball

Coach John McLendon Classic champions

CIT, Quarterfinals
- Conference: Ohio Valley Conference
- Record: 19–15 (12–6 OVC)
- Head coach: Matt Figger (1st season)
- Assistant coaches: Rick Cabrera; Dalonte Hill; Sergio Rouco
- Home arena: Dunn Center

2017–18 Ohio Valley Conference men's basketball standings
	Conf.				Overall
Team	W		L	PCT	W		L	PCT
Murray State †	16	–	2	.889	26	–	6	.813
Belmont	15	–	3	.833	24	–	9	.727
Austin Peay	12	–	6	.667	19	–	15	.559
Jacksonville State	11	–	7	.611	23	–	13	.639
Tennessee Tech	10	–	8	.556	19	–	14	.576
Tennessee State	10	–	8	.556	15	–	15	.500
Southeast Missouri State*	8	–	10	.444	14	–	17	.452
Eastern Illinois	7	–	11	.389	12	–	19	.387
SIU Edwardsville	5	–	13	.278	9	–	21	.300
UT Martin	5	–	13	.278	10	–	21	.323
Eastern Kentucky	5	–	13	.278	11	–	20	.355
Morehead State	4	–	14	.222	8	–	21	.276
† 2018 OVC tournament winner *ineligible for postseason due to APR violations

The 2017–18 Austin Peay Governors men's basketball team represented Austin Peay State University during the 2017–18 NCAA Division I men's basketball season. The Governors, led by first-year head coach Matt Figger, played their home games at the Dunn Center in Clarksville, Tennessee as members of the Ohio Valley Conference. They finished the season 19–15, 12–6 in OVC play to finish in third place. They defeated Eastern Illinois in the quarterfinals of the OVC tournament before losing in the semifinals to Belmont. They were invited to the CollegeInsider.com Tournament where they defeated Louisiana–Monroe in the first round, a game referred to as the Coach John McLendon Classic, and received a second round bye before losing in the quarterfinals to UIC.

== Previous season ==
The Governors finished the 2016–17 season 11–19, 7–9 in OVC play to finish in fourth place in the West Division. They failed to qualify for the Ohio Valley Conference tournament.

On March 2, 2017, head coach Dave Loos announced his retirement. He had been undergoing cancer treatment during the season, and had taken a medical leave in January 2017, missing four games. He finished with a 27 year record of 420–410. On April 3, South Carolina assistant Matt Figger was hired as the new head coach of APSU.

== Preseason ==
In a vote of conference coaches and sports information directors, Austin Peay was picked to finish in 11th place in the OVC.

After five years of divisional play in the OVC, the conference eliminated divisions for the 2017–18 season. Additionally, for the first time, each conference team will play 18 conference games.

== Roster ==
2017–18 Austin Peay Governors men's basketball team
Players
Coaches

Pos.	#	Name	Height	Weight	Year	Hometown
G	0	Acoydan McCarthy	6 ft 6 in (1.98 m)	174 lb (79 kg)	Fr	Las Palmas, Spain
G	1	Tre’ Ivory	5 ft 11 in (1.8 m)	185 lb (84 kg)	Sr	Louisville, Kentucky
G/F	2	Deyshawn Martin	6 ft 6 in (1.98 m)	200 lb (91 kg)	Jr	Pittsburgh, Pennsylvania
F	3	Chris Porter-Bunton	6 ft 5 in (1.96 m)	217 lb (98 kg)	RS Jr	Bowling Green, Kentucky
G	4	Dayton Gumm	6 ft 2 in (1.88 m)	172 lb (78 kg)	Fr	Bowling Green, Kentucky
G	10	Ferran Bernacer	6 ft 5 in (1.96 m)	191 lb (87 kg)	Fr	Portocolom, Spain
G	11	Ed Stephens	6 ft 2 in (1.88 m)	—	Sr	Columbia, South Carolina
C	15	Ivan Cucak	7 ft 0 in (2.13 m)	235 lb (107 kg)	Fr	Kitchener, Ontario
G	21	Terry Taylor	6 ft 5 in (1.96 m)	217 lb (98 kg)	Fr	Bowling Green, Kentucky
F	22	Richard Henderson	6 ft 6 in (1.98 m)	220 lb (100 kg)	Fr	Maryland Heights, Missouri
G/F	23	Steve Harris	6 ft 4 in (1.93 m)	180 lb (82 kg)	Jr	St. Louis, Missouri
F	24	Averyl Ugba	6 ft 7 in (2.01 m)	225 lb (102 kg)	Sr	Silver Spring, Maryland
G	25	Zach Glotta	6 ft 0 in (1.83 m)	185 lb (84 kg)	Jr	O'Fallon, Missouri

Head coach

- Matt Figger (Eastern Kentucky)

Assistant coach(es)

- Rick Cabrera (Tennessee Tech)
- Dalonte Hill (UNC Charlotte)
- Sergio Rouco (Nova Southeastern)

Legend

- (C) Team captain
- (S) Suspended
- (I) Ineligible
- (W) Walk-on
- Injured
- Current redshirt

Roster
Last update: November 6, 2017

== Schedule and results ==
Date time, TV	Rank^{#}	Opponent^{#}	Result	Record	Site (attendance) city, state
Exhibition
Nov 4, 2017*; 7:00 pm		Sewanee	W 95–78		Dunn Center (1,974); Clarksville, TN
Non-conference regular Season
Nov 10, 2017*; 8:30 pm, SECN		at Vanderbilt; NIT Season Tip-Off	L 54–73	0–1	Memorial Gymnasium (8,609); Nashville, TN
Nov 13, 2017*; 6:00 pm, ACCN Extra		at Virginia; NIT Season Tip-Off	L 49–93	0–2	John Paul Jones Arena (12,995); Charlottesville, VA
Nov 15, 2017*; 7:00 pm		Oakland City; NIT Season Tip-Off	W 109–50	1–2	Dunn Center (1,178); Clarksville, TN
Nov 19, 2017*; 2:00 pm		UNC Asheville; NIT Season Tip-Off	L 79–82 ^{OT}	1–3	Dunn Center (2,017); Clarksville, TN
Nov 22, 2017*; 3:00 pm		Bethel (TN); Played at Fort Campbell military installation	W 90–58	2–3	Shaw Fitness Center (726); Hopkinsville, KY
Nov 26, 2017*; 2:00 pm		Miami (OH)	W 86–61	3–3	Dunn Center (1,164); Clarksville, TN
Nov 29, 2017*; 7:00 pm, FSOK+		at Oklahoma State	L 63–79	3–4	Gallagher-Iba Arena (4,697); Stillwater, OK
Dec 2, 2017*; 3:30 pm		Alabama A&M	W 67–47	4–4	Dunn Center (1,417); Clarksville, TN
Dec 6, 2017*; 7:00 pm, BTN		at Illinois	L 57–64	4–5	State Farm Center (12,352); Champaign, IL
Dec 16, 2017*; 3:00 pm		at Evansville	L 74–78	4–6	Ford Center (3,403); Evansville, IN
Dec 19, 2017*; 7:00 pm		Troy	W 75–73	5–6	Dunn Center (1,51); Clarksville, TN
Dec 22, 2017*; 7:00 pm		Western Kentucky	L 55–72	5–7	Dunn Center (2,023); Clarksville, TN
Ohio Valley Conference regular season
Dec 28, 2017; 7:00 pm		SIU Edwardsville	W 78–58	6–7 (1–0)	Dunn Center (1,648); Clarksville, TN
Dec 30, 2017; 7:00 pm		Eastern Illinois	W 70–54	7–7 (2–0)	Dunn Center (2,051); Clarksville, TN
Jan 4, 2018; 6:00 pm, CBSSN		UT Martin	W 75–69	8–7 (3–0)	Dunn Center (1,737); Clarksville, TN
Jan 6, 2018; 7:00 pm		Southeast Missouri State	W 76–71	9–7 (4–0)	Dunn Center (1,825); Clarksville, TN
Jan 11, 2018; 7:30 pm		at Tennessee Tech	L 74–86	9–8 (4–1)	Eblen Center (1,334); Cookeville, TN
Jan 13, 2018; 4:30 pm		at Jacksonville State	W 87–67	10–8 (5–1)	Pete Mathews Coliseum (1,933); Jacksonville, AL
Jan 18, 2018; 7:30 pm		at Tennessee State	L 56–70	10–9 (5–2)	Gentry Complex (1,301); Nashville, TN
Jan 20, 2018; 5:00 pm		at Belmont	L 59–83	10–10 (5–3)	Curb Event Center (2,731); Nashville, TN
Jan 25, 2018; 7:30 pm		Eastern Kentucky	W 90–84	11–10 (6–3)	Dunn Center (2,326); Clarksville, TN
Jan 27, 2018; 7:00 pm		Morehead State	W 92–76	12–10 (7–3)	Dunn Center (2,345); Clarksville, TN
Feb 1, 2018; 7:30 pm		at UT Martin	W 59–57	13–10 (8–3)	Skyhawk Arena (1,971); Martin, TN
Feb 3, 2018; 4:15 pm		at Southeast Missouri State	W 96–81	14–10 (9–3)	Show Me Center (2,234); Cape Girardeau, MO
Feb 8, 2018; 6:00 pm, CBSSN		at Murray State	L 63–84	14–11 (9–4)	CFSB Center (4,339); Murray, KY
Feb 10, 2018; 3:15 pm		at Eastern Illinois	W 75–69	15–11 (10–4)	Lantz Arena (1,407); Charleston, IL
Feb 15, 2018; 7:30 pm		Tennessee Tech	L 80–86	15–12 (10–5)	Dunn Center (1,613); Clarksville, TN
Feb 17, 2018; 7:00 pm		Jacksonville State	W 60–57	16–12 (11–5)	Dunn Center (2,353); Clarksville, TN
Feb 22, 2018; 7:00 pm		at SIU Edwardsville	W 86–82	17–12 (12–5)	Vadalabene Center (1,583); Edwardsville, IL
Feb 24, 2018; 7:00 pm		Murray State	L 64–73	17–13 (12–6)	Dunn Center (4,343); Clarksville, TN
Ohio Valley Conference tournament
Mar 1, 2018; 9:00 pm	(3)	vs. (7) Eastern Illinois; Quarterfinals	W 73–66	18–13	Ford Center (914); Evansville, IN
Mar 2, 2018; 9:30 pm, ESPNU	(3)	vs. (2) Belmont; Semifinals	L 79–94	18–14	Ford Center (3,403); Evansville, IN
CIT
Mar 15, 2018*; 7:00 pm		Louisiana–Monroe; First round – Coach John McLendon Classic	W 80–66	19–14	Dunn Center (1,228); Clarksville, TN
Mar 21, 2018*; 7:00 pm		UIC; Quarterfinals	L 81–83	19–15	Dunn Center (1,121); Clarksville, TN
*Non-conference game. ^{#}Rankings from AP Poll. (#) Tournament seedings in parentheses. All times are in Central Time Source.
