= 2017–18 Southeast Missouri State Redhawks men's basketball team =

American college basketball season

2017–18 Southeast Missouri State Redhawks men's basketball
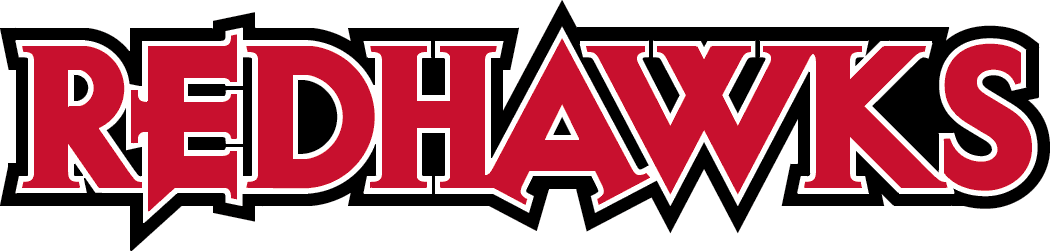
- Conference: Ohio Valley Conference
- Record: 14–17 (8–10 OVC)
- Head coach: Rick Ray (3rd season)
- Assistant coaches: Adam Gordon; Chris Moore; Nick Lagroone
- Home arena: Show Me Center

2017–18 Ohio Valley Conference men's basketball standings
	Conf.				Overall
Team	W		L	PCT	W		L	PCT
Murray State †	16	–	2	.889	26	–	6	.813
Belmont	15	–	3	.833	24	–	9	.727
Austin Peay	12	–	6	.667	19	–	15	.559
Jacksonville State	11	–	7	.611	23	–	13	.639
Tennessee Tech	10	–	8	.556	19	–	14	.576
Tennessee State	10	–	8	.556	15	–	15	.500
Southeast Missouri State*	8	–	10	.444	14	–	17	.452
Eastern Illinois	7	–	11	.389	12	–	19	.387
SIU Edwardsville	5	–	13	.278	9	–	21	.300
UT Martin	5	–	13	.278	10	–	21	.323
Eastern Kentucky	5	–	13	.278	11	–	20	.355
Morehead State	4	–	14	.222	8	–	21	.276
† 2018 OVC tournament winner *ineligible for postseason due to APR violations

The 2017–18 Southeast Missouri State Redhawks men's basketball team represented Southeast Missouri State University during the 2017–18 NCAA Division I men's basketball season. The Redhawks, led by third-year head coach Rick Ray, played their home games at the Show Me Center in Cape Girardeau, Missouri as members of the Ohio Valley Conference. They finished the season 14–17, 8–10 in OVC play to finish in seventh place.

The team was ineligible for postseason play this season due to APR violations.

== Previous season ==
The Redhawks finished the 2016–17 season 15–18, 9–7 in OVC play to finish in second place in the West Division. They defeated Tennessee State in the first round of the OVC tournament to advance to the quarterfinals where they lost to Jacksonville State.

== Preseason ==
In a vote of conference coaches and sports information directors, SEMO was picked to finish in 10th place in the OVC. Denzel Mahoney was named to the 2017–18 Preseason All-OVC team.

After five years of divisional play in the OVC, the conference eliminated divisions for the 2017–18 season. Additionally, for the first time, each conference team will play 18 conference games.

== Roster ==
2017–18 Southeast Missouri State Redhawks men's basketball team
Players
Coaches

Pos.	#	Name	Height	Weight	Year	Hometown
G	1	Dondre Duffus	6 ft 3 in (1.91 m)	183 lb (83 kg)	RS Jr	Palm Beach, Florida
G	3	Ray Kowalski	6 ft 3 in (1.91 m)	195 lb (88 kg)	RS Fr	Concord, North Carolina
G	4	Milos Vranes	6 ft 7 in (2.01 m)	200 lb (91 kg)	Sr	Belgrade, Serbia
F	5	Jonathan Dalton	5 ft 10 in (1.78 m)	155 lb (70 kg)	Jr	New Orleans, Louisiana
G	10	Khalil Cuffee	6 ft 4 in (1.93 m)	210 lb (95 kg)	Jr	Fairburn, Georgia
F	13	Isaiah Gable	6 ft 7 in (2.01 m)	195 lb (88 kg)	RS Fr	Greenville, Ohio
G	15	Donnie Lewis	6 ft 1 in (1.85 m)	170 lb (77 kg)	Jr	Lexington, Kentucky
F	20	Justin Carpenter	6 ft 9 in (2.06 m)	230 lb (104 kg)	Fr	Mount Carmel, Illinois
G	22	Skyler Hogan	6 ft 3 in (1.91 m)	180 lb (82 kg)	RS So	Melbourne, Florida
G	23	Daniel Simmons	6 ft 2 in (1.88 m)	196 lb (89 kg)	Sr	Biggersville, Mississippi
G	25	Ledarrius Brewer	6 ft 5 in (1.96 m)	200 lb (91 kg)	Fr	Meridian, Mississippi
G	34	Denzel Mahoney	6 ft 4 in (1.93 m)	213 lb (97 kg)	So	Oviedo, Florida
C	42	Mark Laros	6 ft 10 in (2.08 m)	223 lb (101 kg)	Jr	Hengelo, Netherlands

Head coach

- Rick Ray (Grand View College)

Assistant coach(es)

- Adam Gordon (Tampa)
- Chris Moore (Kentucky State)
- Nick Lagroone (Southern Wesleyan)

Legend

- (C) Team captain
- (S) Suspended
- (I) Ineligible
- (W) Walk-on
- Injured
- Current redshirt

Roster
Last update: November 9, 2017

== Schedule and results ==
Date time, TV	Opponent	Result	Record	Site (attendance) city, state
Exhibition
Nov 01, 2017*; 6:30 pm	Missouri S&T	W 94–75		Show Me Center (565); Cape Girardeau, MO
Nov 04, 2017*; 6:00 pm	Missouri Southern	W 85–77		Show Me Center; Cape Girardeau, MO
Non-conference regular season
Nov 10, 2017*; 6:30 pm	Missouri Baptist	W 81–69	1–0	Show Me Center (1,239); Cape Girardeau, MO
Nov 13, 2017*; 6:30 pm	at Louisiana Tech; Cancún Challenge	L 95–96 ^{OT}	1–1	Thomas Assembly Center (2,456); Ruston, LA
Nov 16, 2017*; 7:00 pm, ESPN3	at Evansville; Cancún Challenge	L 50–66	1–2	Ford Center (3,151); Evansville, IN
Nov 21, 2017*; 2:00 pm	vs. Cal State Northridge; Cancún Challenge Mayan Division semifinals	W 74–59	2–2	Hard Rock Hotel Riviera Maya; Cancún, Mexico
Nov 22, 2017*; 2:00 pm	vs. Montana State; Cancún Challenge Mayan Division finals	L 82–88	2–3	Hard Rock Hotel Riviera Maya; Cancún, Mexico
Nov 26, 2017*; 2:00 pm	North Carolina Central	L 70–77	2–4	Show Me Center (645); Cape Girardeau, MO
Nov 28, 2017*; 6:30 pm	Hannibal–LaGrange	W 83–59	3–4	Show Me Center (815); Cape Girardeau, MO
Dec 02, 2017*; 6:00 pm	at North Carolina Central	W 86–77	4–4	McLendon–McDougald Gymnasium (873); Durham, NC
Dec 06, 2017*; 6:30 pm	UMKC	W 91–87	5–4	Show Me Center (1,586); Cape Girardeau, MO
Dec 09, 2017*; 7:00 pm, ESPN3	at Southern Illinois	W 75–69	6–4	SIU Arena (4,493); Carbondale, IL
Dec 16, 2017*; 7:00 pm, FSKC	at Kansas State	L 71–89	6–5	Bramlage Coliseum (7,389); Manhattan, KS
Dec 20, 2017*; 1:00 pm	Bradley	L 67–75	6–6	Show Me Center (702); Cape Girardeau, MO
Dec 22, 2017*; 7:00 pm, FSMW	at Saint Louis	L 48–78	6–7	Chaifetz Arena (8,021); St. Louis, MO
Ohio Valley Conference regular season
Dec 28, 2017; 7:30 pm	Belmont	L 72–94	6–8 (0–1)	Show Me Center (1,310); Cape Girardeau, MO
Dec 31, 2017; 1:00 pm	Tennessee State	W 77–65	7–8 (1–1)	Show Me Center (615); Cape Girardeau, MO
Jan 4, 2018; 7:00 pm	at Murray State	L 73–89	7–9 (1–2)	CFSB Center (2,728); Murray, KY
Jan 6, 2018; 7:00 pm	at Austin Peay	L 71–76	7–10 (1–3)	Dunn Center (1,825); Clarksville, TN
Jan 11, 2018; 7:30 pm	Morehead State	W 78–75	8–10 (2–3)	Show Me Center (915); Cape Girardeau, MO
Jan 13, 2017; 4:15 pm	Eastern Kentucky	L 86–91	8–11 (2–4)	Show Me Center (1,206); Cape Girardeau, MO
Jan 18, 2018; 7:00 pm	at SIU Edwardsville	W 86–74	9–11 (3–4)	Vadalabene Center (1,147); Edwardsville, IL
Jan 20, 2018; 3:15 pm	at Eastern Illinois	W 86–74	10–11 (4–4)	Lantz Arena (1,369); Charleston, IL
Jan 25, 2018; 7:30 pm	at Tennessee Tech	L 65–76	10–12 (4–5)	Eblen Center (1,936); Cookeville, TN
Jan 27, 2018; 7:00 pm	at Jacksonville State	L 60–78	10–13 (4–6)	Pete Mathews Coliseum (2,688); Jacksonville, AL
Feb 01, 2017; 7:30 pm	Murray State	L 75–87	10–14 (4–7)	Show Me Center (2,035); Cape Girardeau, MO
Feb 03, 2017; 4:15 pm	Austin Peay	L 81–96	10–15 (4–8)	Show Me Center (2,234); Cape Girardeau, MO
Feb 08, 2018; 6:30 pm	at Morehead State	W 78–62	11–15 (5–8)	Ellis Johnson Arena (3,315); Morehead, KY
Feb 10, 2018; 6:00 pm	at UT Martin	W 81–77 ^{OT}	12–15 (6–8)	Skyhawk Arena (1,897); Martin, TN
Feb 15, 2017; 6:30 pm	Eastern Illinois	W 80–73	13–15 (7–8)	Show Me Center (825); Cape Girardeau, MO
Feb 17, 2017; 4:15 pm	SIU Edwardsville	W 79–74	14–15 (8–8)	Show Me Center (1,697); Cape Girardeau, MO
Feb 22, 2018; 7:00 pm	at Eastern Kentucky	L 88–91	14–16 (8–9)	McBrayer Arena (1,840); Richmond, KY
Feb 24, 2017; 4:15 pm	UT Martin	L 66–72	14–17 (8–10)	Show Me Center (1,702); Cape Girardeau, MO
*Non-conference game. ^{#}Rankings from AP Poll. (#) Tournament seedings in parentheses. All times are in Central Time Source.
