= 2017–18 UT Martin Skyhawks men's basketball team =

American college basketball season

2017–18 UT Martin Skyhawks men's basketball
- Conference: Ohio Valley Conference
- West Division
- Record: 10–21 (5–13 OVC)
- Head coach: Anthony Stewart (2nd season)
- Assistant coaches: Jermaine Johnson (4th season); DeAndre Walker (4th season); Zach Carpenter (1st season)
- Home arena: Skyhawk Arena

2017–18 Ohio Valley Conference men's basketball standings
	Conf.				Overall
Team	W		L	PCT	W		L	PCT
Murray State †	16	–	2	.889	26	–	6	.813
Belmont	15	–	3	.833	24	–	9	.727
Austin Peay	12	–	6	.667	19	–	15	.559
Jacksonville State	11	–	7	.611	23	–	13	.639
Tennessee Tech	10	–	8	.556	19	–	14	.576
Tennessee State	10	–	8	.556	15	–	15	.500
Southeast Missouri State*	8	–	10	.444	14	–	17	.452
Eastern Illinois	7	–	11	.389	12	–	19	.387
SIU Edwardsville	5	–	13	.278	9	–	21	.300
UT Martin	5	–	13	.278	10	–	21	.323
Eastern Kentucky	5	–	13	.278	11	–	20	.355
Morehead State	4	–	14	.222	8	–	21	.276
† 2018 OVC tournament winner *ineligible for postseason due to APR violations

The 2017–18 UT Martin Skyhawks men's basketball team represented the University of Tennessee at Martin during the 2017–18 NCAA Division I men's basketball season. The Skyhawks, led by second-year head coach Anthony Stewart, played their home games at Skyhawk Arena as members of the Ohio Valley Conference (OVC). They finished the season 10–21, 5–13 in OVC play, to finish in a three-way tie for ninth place. They failed to qualify for the OVC tournament.

== Previous season ==
The Skyhawks finished the 2016–17 season 22–13, 10–6 in OVC play, to win the West Division championship. As the No. 2 seed in the OVC tournament, they defeated Murray State before losing to Jacksonville State in the championship game. They were invited to the CollegeInsider.com Tournament where they defeated UNC Asheville in the first round before losing in the second round to Campbell.

== Preseason ==
In a vote of conference coaches and sports information directors, UT Martin was picked to finish in eighth place in the OVC. Senior guard Matthew Butler was named to the All-OVC Team.

After five years of divisional play in the OVC, the conference eliminated divisions for the 2017–18 season. Additionally, for the first time, each conference team will play 18 conference games.

== Roster ==
2017–18 UT Martin Skyhawks men's basketball team
Players
Coaches

Pos.	#	Name	Height	Weight	Year	Previous school	Hometown
G	0	Preston Parks	6 ft 1 in (1.85 m)	175 lb (79 kg)	So	The Citadel	Greenville, SC
G	1	Matthew Butler	6 ft 2 in (1.88 m)	185 lb (84 kg)	RS Sr	Rhode Island	Memphis, TN
G	2	Defincko Bogan	5 ft 10 in (1.78 m)	190 lb (86 kg)	Jr	Moberly Area CC	Charleston, MO
G	4	Parrish Hewitt	6 ft 3 in (1.91 m)	175 lb (79 kg)	Fr	Douglass HS	Memphis, TN
C	5	Terrence Parker	6 ft 9 in (2.06 m)	230 lb (104 kg)	Jr	Three Rivers CC	Wilson, NC
G	10	Kevin Little	6 ft 0 in (1.83 m)	170 lb (77 kg)	Sr	Colorado State	Wyandanch, NY
G	11	Darius Thompson	6 ft 3 in (1.91 m)	185 lb (84 kg)	Jr	Mineral Area CC	Memphis, TN
F	12	Fatodd Lewis	6 ft 8 in (2.03 m)	225 lb (102 kg)	RS Jr	Raleigh-Egypt HS	Memphis, TN
F	13	Mike Fofana	6 ft 8 in (2.03 m)	210 lb (95 kg)	So	Whitehaven HS	Memphis, TN
F	14	Julian Thompson-Clay	6 ft 3 in (1.91 m)	230 lb (104 kg)	RS Jr	Rossview HS	Clarksville, TN
G	15	Dominique Williams	6 ft 6 in (1.98 m)	205 lb (93 kg)	RS Sr	Radford	Washington, D.C.
G	22	Kahari Beaufort	6 ft 4 in (1.93 m)	185 lb (84 kg)	Sr	Angelina CC	Hartford, CT
F	24	Jerome Davis	6 ft 7 in (2.01 m)	215 lb (98 kg)	Jr	John A. Logan CC	Waukegan, IL
C	25	Dalen Victor	6 ft 10 in (2.08 m)	235 lb (107 kg)	RS Jr	Eastern Oklahoma State CC	Orlando, FL
F	30	Jailen Gill	6 ft 8 in (2.03 m)	235 lb (107 kg)	Jr	Antelope Valley CC	Kansas City, MO
G	55	Lorenzen Jr. Wright	6 ft 4 in (1.93 m)	185 lb (84 kg)	Sr	Robert Morris	Memphis, TN

Head coach

- Anthony Stewart (Mount Union)

Assistant coach(es)

- Jermaine Johnson (United States Sports Academy)
- DeAndre Walker (Fairmont State)
- Zack Carpenter (Lee)

Legend

- (C) Team captain
- (S) Suspended
- (I) Ineligible
- (W) Walk-on
- Injured
- Current redshirt

Roster
Last update: June 9, 2024

== Schedule and results ==
Date time, TV	Opponent	Result	Record	Site (attendance) city, state
Non-conference regular season
November 10, 2017*; 7:00 p.m.	at Marshall; Global Sports Invitational	L 91–102 ^{OT}	0–1	Cam Henderson Center (5,754); Huntington, WV
November 12, 2017*; 5:00 p.m., ESPNU	at Illinois; Global Sports Invitational	L 74–77	0–2	State Farm Center (11,882); Champaign, IL
November 15, 2017*; 7:00 p.m., OVCDN	North Carolina Central; Global Sports Invitational	W 74–57	1–2	Skyhawk Arena (1,274); Martin, TN
November 18, 2017*; 6:00 p.m., ESPN3	at Akron	L 59–76	1–3	James A. Rhodes Arena (2,713); Akron, OH
November 22, 2017*; 7:00 p.m.	at Southern; Global Sports Invitational	L 66–69	1–4	F. G. Clark Center (225); Baton Rouge, LA
November 26, 2017*; 4:00 p.m., OVCDN	UMKC	L 55–65	1–5	Skyhawk Arena (1,338); Martin, TN
November 29, 2017*; 7:00 p.m., SECN	at LSU	L 60–84	1–6	Maravich Center (7,396); Baton Rouge, LA
December 2, 2017*; 4:00 p.m., ESPN3	at Chattanooga	L 63–66	1–7	McKenzie Arena (3,676); Chattanooga, TN
December 5, 2017*; 7:30 p.m.	at Arkansas State	W 92–78	2–7	First National Bank Arena (2,116); Jonesboro, AR
December 10, 2017*; 2:00 p.m., OVCDN	UC Clermont	W 127–92	3–7	Skyhawk Arena (1,014); Martin, TN
December 16, 2017*; 7:00 p.m., SECN+	at Mississippi State	L 61–92	3–8	Humphrey Coliseum (6,709); Starkville, MS
December 20, 2017*; 7:00 p.m., OVCDN	Blue Mountain	W 84–76	4–8	Skyhawk Arena (1,080); Martin, TN
December 22, 2017*; 7:00 p.m., OVCDN	Arkansas–Pine Bluff	W 74–68	5–8	Skyhawk Arena (814); Martin, TN
Ohio Valley Conference regular season
December 28, 2017; 6:00 p.m., CBSSN	Tennessee State	W 63–60 ^{OT}	6–8 (1–0)	Skyhawk Arena (2,009); Martin, TN
December 30, 2017; 6:00 p.m., OVCDN	Belmont	L 58–65	6–9 (1–1)	Skyhawk Arena (1,347); Martin, TN
January 4, 2018; 6:00 p.m., CBSSN	at Austin Peay	L 69–75	6–10 (1–2)	Dunn Center (1,737); Clarksville, TN
January 6, 2018; 7:00 p.m., OVCDN	at Murray State	L 68–82	6–11 (1–3)	CFSB Center (4,781); Murray, KY
January 11, 2018; 7:30 p.m., OVCDN	Eastern Kentucky	L 70–78	6–12 (1–4)	Skyhawk Arena (1,576); Martin, TN
January 13, 2018; 7:30 p.m., OVCDN	Morehead State	L 67–71	6–13 (1–5)	Skyhawk Arena (1,013); Martin, TN
January 18, 2018; 7:30 p.m., OVCDN	at Eastern Illinois	L 60–80	6–14 (1–6)	Lantz Arena (1,245); Charleston, IL
January 20, 2018; 1:00 p.m., FSMW/OVCDN	at SIU Edwardsville	W 70–69	7–14 (2–6)	Vadalabene Center (1,234); Edwardsville, IL
January 25, 2018; 7:30 p.m., OVCDN	at Jacksonville State	W 67–63	8–14 (3–6)	Pete Mathews Coliseum (1,482); Jacksonville, AL
January 27, 2018; 7:30 p.m., OVCDN	at Tennessee Tech	L 55–63	8–15 (3–7)	Eblen Center (2,283); Cookeville, TN
February 1, 2018; 7:30 p.m., OVCDN	Austin Peay	L 57–59	8–16 (3–8)	Skyhawk Arena (1,971); Martin, TN
February 3, 2018; 6:00 p.m., OVCDN	Murray State	L 53–66	8–17 (3–9)	Skyhawk Arena (3,247); Martin, TN
February 8, 2018; 7:00 p.m., OVCDN	at Eastern Kentucky	W 70–69	9–17 (4–9)	McBrayer Arena (1,120); Richmond, KY
February 10, 2018; 6:00 p.m., OVCDN	Southeast Missouri State	L 77–81 ^{OT}	9–18 (4–10)	Skyhawk Arena (1,897); Martin, TN
February 15, 2018; 7:00 p.m., OVCDN	SIU Edwardsville	L 69–70	9–19 (4–11)	Skyhawk Arena (1,001); Martin, TN
February 17, 2018; 6:00 p.m., OVCDN	Eastern Illinois	L 57–64	9–20 (4–12)	Skyhawk Arena (1,469); Martin, TN
February 22, 2018; 6:30 p.m., OVCDN	at Morehead State	L 53–70	9–21 (4–13)	Ellis Johnson Arena (1,873); Morehead, KY
February 24, 2018; 4:15 p.m., OVCDN	at Southeast Missouri State	W 72–66	10–21 (5–13)	Show Me Center (1,702); Cape Girardeau, MO
*Non-conference game. ^{#}Rankings from AP poll. (#) Tournament seedings in parentheses. All times are in Central.
