= 2017–18 Belmont Bruins men's basketball team =

American college basketball season

2017–18 Belmont Bruins men's basketball

2K Sports Classic Nashville Subregional champions
- Conference: Ohio Valley Conference
- Record: 24–9 (15–3 OVC)
- Head coach: Rick Byrd (32nd season)
- Assistant coaches: Brian Ayers; James Strong; Mark Price
- Home arena: Curb Event Center

2017–18 Ohio Valley Conference men's basketball standings
	Conf.				Overall
Team	W		L	PCT	W		L	PCT
Murray State †	16	–	2	.889	26	–	6	.813
Belmont	15	–	3	.833	24	–	9	.727
Austin Peay	12	–	6	.667	19	–	15	.559
Jacksonville State	11	–	7	.611	23	–	13	.639
Tennessee Tech	10	–	8	.556	19	–	14	.576
Tennessee State	10	–	8	.556	15	–	15	.500
Southeast Missouri State*	8	–	10	.444	14	–	17	.452
Eastern Illinois	7	–	11	.389	12	–	19	.387
SIU Edwardsville	5	–	13	.278	9	–	21	.300
UT Martin	5	–	13	.278	10	–	21	.323
Eastern Kentucky	5	–	13	.278	11	–	20	.355
Morehead State	4	–	14	.222	8	–	21	.276
† 2018 OVC tournament winner *ineligible for postseason due to APR violations

The 2017–18 Belmont Bruins men's basketball team represented Belmont University during the 2017–18 NCAA Division I men's basketball season. The Bruins, led by 32nd-year head coach Rick Byrd, played their home games at the Curb Event Center in Nashville, Tennessee as members of the Ohio Valley Conference. They finished the season 24–9, 15–3 in OVC play to finish in second place. They defeated Austin Peay in the semifinals of the OVC tournament to advance to the championship game where they lost to Murray State. Despite having 24 wins, they did not participate in a postseason tournament.

== Previous season ==
The Bruins finished the 2016–17 season 23–7, 15–1 in OVC play to win the regular season championship. In the OVC tournament, they lost in the semifinals to Jacksonville State. As a regular season conference champion who failed to win their conference tournament title, they received an automatic bid to the National Invitation Tournament. There they defeated Georgia in the first round before losing to Georgia Tech.

== Preseason ==
In a vote of Ohio Valley Conference head men's basketball coaches and sports information directors, Belmont was picked to win the OVC for the third consecutive year. Senior forward Amanze Egekeze and senior guard Austin Luke were named to the preseason All-OVC team.

After five years of divisional play in the OVC, the conference eliminated divisions for the 2017–18 season. Additionally, for the first time, each conference team will play 18 conference games.

== Roster ==
2017–18 Belmont Bruins men's basketball team
Players
Coaches

Pos.	#	Name	Height	Weight	Year	Hometown
G	0	Michael Mayernick	5 ft 8 in (1.73 m)	150 lb (68 kg)	RS Fr	Nashville, Tennessee
G	1	Austin Luke	6 ft 3 in (1.91 m)	200 lb (91 kg)	RS Sr	Rowlett, Texas
G	2	Grayson Murphy (injured) (redshirt)	6 ft 1 in (1.85 m)	170 lb (77 kg)	Fr	Thompson's Station, Tennessee
G/F	3	Dylan Windler	6 ft 7 in (2.01 m)	195 lb (88 kg)	Jr	Indianapolis, Indiana
G/F	10	Caleb Hollander	6 ft 8 in (2.03 m)	230 lb (104 kg)	Fr	Nashville, Tennessee
F	11	Kevin McClain	6 ft 2 in (1.88 m)	180 lb (82 kg)	Jr	Jennings, Florida
G	14	Nick Hopkins	5 ft 11 in (1.8 m)	160 lb (73 kg)	RS Fr	Fayetteville, Tennessee
G	20	Tate Pierson	6 ft 5 in (1.96 m)	180 lb (82 kg)	Fr	Brentwood, Tennessee
G	21	Burton Sampson (W)	6 ft 4 in (1.93 m)	195 lb (88 kg)	RS Sr	Knoxville, Tennessee
G	24	Micahel Benkert	6 ft 4 in (1.93 m)	195 lb (88 kg)	RS So	Greenwood, Indiana
F	25	Mack Mercer	6 ft 9 in (2.06 m)	230 lb (104 kg)	RS Jr	Plymouth, Indiana
F	32	Amanze Egekeze	6 ft 8 in (2.03 m)	220 lb (100 kg)	Sr	Lake in the Hills, Illinois
C	33	Nick Muszynski (redshirt)	6 ft 10 in (2.08 m)	220 lb (100 kg)	Fr	Pickerington, Ohio
G	35	Pedro Bradshaw	6 ft 7 in (2.01 m)	180 lb (82 kg)	RS Fr	Russellville, Kentucky
C	41	Tyler Hadden	6 ft 10 in (2.08 m)	240 lb (109 kg)	RS Sr	Cincinnati, Ohio
C	50	Seth Adelsperger	6 ft 11 in (2.11 m)	225 lb (102 kg)	RS So	Peru, Indiana

Head coach

- Rick Byrd (Tennessee)

Assistant coach(es)

- Brian Ayers (Lipscomb)
- James Strong (Vanderbilt)
- Mark Price (Samford)

Legend

- (C) Team captain
- (S) Suspended
- (I) Ineligible
- (W) Walk-on
- Injured
- Current redshirt

Roster
Last update: 2017-10-22

== Schedule and results ==
Date time, TV	Rank^{#}	Opponent^{#}	Result	Record	Site (attendance) city, state
Exhibition
Nov 2, 2017*; 9:00 pm		at Trevecca Nazarene; Hurricane Relief Fundraiser	W 91–64		Trojan Fieldhouse (623); Nashville, TN
Regular season
Nov 10, 2017*; 9:00 pm, P12N		at Washington; 2K Sports Classic	L 82–86	0–1	Alaska Airlines Arena (5,883); Seattle, WA
Nov 13, 2017*; 6:30 pm		Vanderbilt	W 69–60	1–1	Curb Event Center (5,266); Nashville, TN
Nov 16, 2017*; 6:30 pm		at Middle Tennessee	W 69–63	2–1	Murphy Center (5,366); Murfreesboro, TN
Nov 18, 2017*; 2:30 pm		Houston Baptist; 2K Sports Classic subregional semifinals	W 93–88	3–1	Curb Event Center (1,502); Nashville, TN
Nov 19, 2017*; 1:00 pm		Seattle; 2K Sports Classic subregional finals	W 90–77	4–1	Curb Event Center (1,087); Nashville, TN
Nov 22, 2017*; 6:00 pm, FS1		at Providence; 2K Sports Classic	L 65–66	4–2	Dunkin' Donuts Center (6,857); Providence, RI
Nov 27, 2017*; 6:30 pm		Lipscomb	L 66–74	4–3	Curb Event Center (2,754); Nashville, TN
Nov 29, 2017*; 8:00 pm, FSSW+		at No. 23 TCU	L 76–87	4–4	Schollmaier Arena (6,237); Fort Worth, TX
Dec 2, 2017*; 1:00 pm		Green Bay	W 86–75	5–4	Curb Event Center (1,086); Nashville, TN
Dec 4, 2017*; 7:15 pm		at Lipscomb	L 66–74	5–5	Allen Arena (2,754); Nashville, TN
Dec 13, 2017*; 6:30 pm		Milwaukee	W 82–63	6–5	Curb Event Center (1,612); Nashville, TN
Dec 16, 2017*; 2:00 pm		Pepperdine	W 79–62	7–5	Curb Event Center (1,427); Nashville, TN
Dec 19, 2017*; 7:00 pm, FCS		at WKU	W 75–72	8–5	E.A. Diddle Arena (5,156); Bowling Green, KY
Ohio Valley regular season
Dec 28, 2017; 7:30 pm		at Southeast Missouri State	W 94–72	9–5 (1–0)	Show Me Center (1,310); Cape Girardeau, MO
Dec 30, 2017; 6:00 pm		at UT Martin	W 65–58	10–5 (2–0)	Skyhawk Arena (1,347); Martin, TN
Jan 4, 2018; 7:00 pm		Tennessee Tech	W 80–67	11–5 (3–0)	Curb Event Center (1,807); Nashville, TN
Jan 6, 2018; 5:00 pm		Jacksonville State	L 60–64	11–6 (3–1)	Curb Event Center (1,789); Nashville, TN
Jan 11, 2018; 7:00 pm, FSMW		at SIU Edwardsville	W 76–61	12–6 (4–1)	Vadalabene Center (1,165); Edwardsville, IL
Jan 13, 2018; 3:15 pm		at Eastern Illinois	W 75–66	13–6 (5–1)	Lantz Arena (1,493); Charleston, IL
Jan 18, 2018; 6:00 pm, ESPNU		Murray State	W 79–72	14–6 (6–1)	Curb Event Center (2,354); Nashville, TN
Jan 20, 2018; 5:00 pm		Austin Peay	W 83–59	15–6 (7–1)	Curb Event Center (2,731); Nashville, TN
Jan 25, 2018; 7:00 pm		Eastern Illinois	W 81–59	16–6 (8–1)	Curb Event Center (1,954); Nashville, TN
Jan 27, 2018; 5:00 pm		SIU Edwardsville	W 83–72	17–6 (9–1)	Curb Event Center (2,454); Nashville, TN
Feb 1, 2018; 7:00 pm		at Eastern Kentucky	W 98–63	18–6 (10–1)	McBrayer Arena (1,620); Richmond, KY
Feb 3, 2018; 3:00 pm		at Morehead State	W 83–73	19–6 (11–1)	Ellis Johnson Arena (3,292); Morehead, KY
Feb 8, 2018; 7:30 pm		at Tennessee State	L 56–64	19–7 (11–2)	Gentry Complex (5,411); Nashville, TN
Feb 10, 2018; 7:30 pm, WCTE		at Tennessee Tech	W 75–70	20–7 (12–2)	Eblen Center (4,058); Cookeville, TN
Feb 15, 2018; 7:00 pm		Eastern Kentucky	W 84–73	21–7 (13–2)	Curb Event Center (2,812); Nashville, TN
Feb 17, 2018; 7:00 pm, CBSSN		Morehead State	W 108–65	22–7 (14–2)	Curb Event Center (2,689); Nashville, TN
Feb 22, 2018; 8:00 pm, ESPNU		at Jacksonville State	L 67–78	22–8 (14–3)	Pete Mathews Coliseum (2,393); Jacksonville, AL
Feb 24, 2018; 5:00 pm		Tennessee State	W 84–59	23–8 (15–3)	Curb Event Center (5,074); Nashville, TN
Ohio Valley Conference tournament
Mar 2, 2018; 9:00 pm, ESPNU	(2)	vs. (3) Austin Peay; Semifinals	W 94–79	24–8	Ford Center (3,403); Evansville, IN
Mar 3, 2018; 7:00 pm, ESPN2	(2)	vs. (1) Murray State; Championship game	L 51–68	24–9	Ford Center (4,280); Evansville, IN
*Non-conference game. ^{#}Rankings from AP Poll. (#) Tournament seedings in parentheses. All times are in Central Time.
