= 2017–18 Eastern Illinois Panthers men's basketball team =

American college basketball season

2017–18 Eastern Illinois Panthers men's basketball
- Conference: Ohio Valley Conference
- Record: 12–19 (7–11 OVC)
- Head coach: Jay Spoonhour (6th season)
- Assistant coaches: Rand Chappell; J.R. Renolds; Rob Holloway
- Home arena: Lantz Arena

2017–18 Ohio Valley Conference men's basketball standings
	Conf.				Overall
Team	W		L	PCT	W		L	PCT
Murray State †	16	–	2	.889	26	–	6	.813
Belmont	15	–	3	.833	24	–	9	.727
Austin Peay	12	–	6	.667	19	–	15	.559
Jacksonville State	11	–	7	.611	23	–	13	.639
Tennessee Tech	10	–	8	.556	19	–	14	.576
Tennessee State	10	–	8	.556	15	–	15	.500
Southeast Missouri State*	8	–	10	.444	14	–	17	.452
Eastern Illinois	7	–	11	.389	12	–	19	.387
SIU Edwardsville	5	–	13	.278	9	–	21	.300
UT Martin	5	–	13	.278	10	–	21	.323
Eastern Kentucky	5	–	13	.278	11	–	20	.355
Morehead State	4	–	14	.222	8	–	21	.276
† 2018 OVC tournament winner *ineligible for postseason due to APR violations

The 2017–18 Eastern Illinois Panthers men's basketball team represented Eastern Illinois University during the 2017–18 NCAA Division I men's basketball season. The Panthers, led by sixth-year head coach Jay Spoonhour, played their home games at Lantz Arena in Charleston, Illinois as members of the Ohio Valley Conference (OVC). They finished the season 12–19, 7–11 in OVC play, to finish in eighth place. They defeated Tennessee State in the first round of the OVC tournament before losing in the quarterfinals to Austin Peay.

== Previous season ==
The Panthers finished the 2016–17 season 14–15, 6–10 in OVC play, to finish in fifth place in the West Division. They failed to qualify for the OVC tournament.

== Preseason ==
After five years of divisional play in the OVC, the conference eliminated divisions for the 2017–18 season. Additionally, for the first time, each conference team played 18 conference games.

In a vote of Ohio Valley Conference head men’s basketball coaches and sports information directors, Eastern Illinois was picked to finish sixth in the OVC.

== Schedule and results ==
Date time, TV	Rank^{#}	Opponent^{#}	Result	Record	Site (attendance) city, state
Exhibition
November 3, 2017*; 7:00 p.m.		Illinois; Hurricane Relief Benefit	W 80–67		Lantz Arena; Charleston, IL
November 6, 2017*; 7:30 p.m.		Southern Indiana	L 92–95		Lantz Arena (687); Charleston, IL
Non-conference regular season
November 11, 2017*; 7:30 p.m., BTN+		at Nebraska	L 68–72	0–1	Pinnacle Bank Arena (11,104); Lincoln, NE
November 15, 2017*; 7:00 p.m.		at Western Illinois	L 54–56	0–2	Western Hall (645); Macomb, IL
November 17, 2017*; 7:30 p.m.		IUPUI	W 80–79	1–2	Lantz Arena (769); Charleston, IL
November 20, 2017*; 9:30 p.m.		at San Diego State	L 63–94	1–3	Viejas Arena (9,821); San Diego, CA
November 24, 2017*; 7:30 p.m.		Fontbonne	W 95–44	2–3	Lantz Arena (544); Charleston, IL
November 27, 2017*; 7:00 p.m.		at Marquette	L 83–86 ^{OT}	2–4	BMO Harris Bradley Center (11,647); Milwaukee, WI
December 1, 2017*; 7:00 p.m.		at Bradley	L 56–67	2–5	Carver Arena (5,275); Peoria, IL
December 6, 2017*; 7:00 p.m.		at Green Bay	L 57–59	2–6	Resch Center (1,925); Green Bay, WI
December 16, 2017*; 3:05 p.m.		at South Alabama	L 52–63	2–7	Mitchell Center (1,901); Mobile, AL
December 19, 2017*; 7:30 p.m.		Western Illinois	W 78–77	3–7	Lantz Arena (737); Charleston, IL
December 21, 2017*; 1:30 p.m.		Saint Francis (IL)	W 74–38	4–7	Lantz Arena (600); Charleston, IL
Ohio Valley Conference regular season
December 28, 2017; 7:00 p.m.		at Murray State	L 52–80	4–8 (0–1)	CFSB Center (2,846); Murray, KY
December 30, 2018; 7:00 p.m.		at Austin Peay	L 54–70	4–9 (0–2)	Dunn Center (2,051); Clarksville, TN
January 4, 2018; 5:00 p.m.		at Morehead State	W 61–52	5–9 (1–2)	Ellis Johnson Arena (1,855); Morehead, KY
January 6, 2018; 3:00 p.m.		at Eastern Kentucky	W 54–53	6–9 (2–2)	McBrayer Arena (1,200); Richmond, KY
January 11, 2018; 6:00 p.m., CBSSN		Tennessee State	L 65–69	6–10 (2–3)	Lantz Arena (1,313); Charleston, IL
January 13, 2018; 3:15 p.m.		Belmont	L 66–75	6–11 (2–4)	Lantz Arena (1,493); Charleston, IL
January 18, 2018; 7:30 p.m.		UT Martin	W 80–60	7–11 (3–4)	Lantz Arena (1,245); Charleston, IL
January 20, 2018; 3:15 p.m.		Southeast Missouri State	L 74–86	7–12 (3–5)	Lantz Arena (1,369); Charleston, IL
January 25, 2018; 7:00 p.m.		at Belmont	L 59–81	7–13 (3–6)	Curb Event Center (1,954); Nashville, TN
January 27, 2018; 7:30 p.m.		at Tennessee State	L 47–50	7–14 (3–7)	Gentry Complex (1,344); Nashville, TN
February 1, 2018; 7:30 p.m.		Jacksonville State	L 56–75	7–15 (3–8)	Lantz Arena (1,643); Charleston, IL
February 3, 2018; 3:15 p.m.		Tennessee Tech	W 79–71	8–15 (4–8)	Lantz Arena (1,831); Charleston, IL
February 8, 2018; 7:00 p.m.		at SIU Edwardsville	W 78–74	9–15 (5–8)	Vadalabene Center (1,205); Edwardsville, IL
February 10, 2018; 3:15 p.m.		Austin Peay	L 69–76	9–16 (5–9)	Lantz Arena (1,407); Charleston, IL
February 15, 2018; 6:30 p.m.		at Southeast Missouri State	L 73–80	9–17 (5–10)	Show Me Center (825); Cape Girardeau, MO
February 17, 2018; 6:00 p.m.		at UT Martin	W 64–57	10–17 (6–10)	Skyhawk Arena (1,469); Martin, TN
February 22, 2018; 7:30 p.m.		Murray State	L 66–76	10–18 (6–11)	Lantz Arena (1,313); Charleston, IL
February 24, 2018; 3:15 p.m.		SIU Edwardsville	W 68–56	11–18 (7–11)	Lantz Arena (1,550); Charleston, IL
Ohio Valley tournament
February 28, 2018; 9:00 p.m.	(7)	vs. (6) Tennessee State; First round	W 73–71	12–18	Ford Center (654); Evansville, IN
March 1, 2018; 9:00 p.m.	(7)	vs. (3) Austin Peay; Quarterfinals	L 66–73	12–19	Ford Center (914); Evansville, IN
*Non-conference game. ^{#}Rankings from AP poll. (#) Tournament seedings in parentheses. All times are in Central.
