= Anthony Smith (basketball) =

American basketball player (born 1997)

No. 24 – Euvic GTK Gliwice
- Position: Power forward
- League: PLK

Personal information
- Born: March 16, 1997 (age 29) Los Angeles, California, U.S.
- Listed height: 6 ft 7 in (2.01 m)
- Listed weight: 225 lb (102 kg)

Career information
- High school: Potomac (Oxon Hill, Maryland)
- College: Barton CC (2015–2017); Murray State (2017–2020)
- NBA draft: 2020: undrafted
- Playing career: 2020–present

Career history
- 2020–2021: Borac Čačak
- 2021–2022: Imortal Basket
- 2022–2023: Chartres Métropole
- 2023: Ostioneros de Guaymas
- 2023: Halcones Rojos Veracruz
- 2023–2024: IHC Apes
- 2024: Ostioneros de Guaymas
- 2024–2025: KK Podgorica
- 2025–2026: CSU Sibiu
- 2026–present: GTK Gliwice

Anthony Smith (born March 16, 1997) is an American professional basketball player for GTK Gliwice of the Polish Basketball League (PLK). He played college basketball for Barton Community College and Murray State.

== High school career ==
Smith attended Potomac High School. As a junior, he helped Potomac finish with a 23–5 record and win the Maryland 2A state title. In December 2015, he tore his lateral collateral ligament while going for a dunk in a 76–68 win over Friendly High School.

== College career ==
Smith played two seasons at Barton Community College. As a sophomore, he averaged 12.7 points and 8.3 rebounds per game, helping the team finish 25–8. Smith earned All-Kansas Jayhawk Community College Conference first team honors and was selected to the NJCAA All-Region 6 team. He posted a career-high 32 points and 11 rebounds in a win over Pratt Community College. Smith signed with Murray State in April 2017. As a junior, he averaged 3.6 points and 3.5 rebounds per game. Smith averaged 7.6 points and 5.0 rebounds per game through five games during the 2018–19 season before being sidelined for the rest of the season with an ankle injury. He was granted a fifth season of eligibility in July 2019. On January 18, 2020, he scored a season-high 22 points and grabbed 10 rebounds in a 96–91 overtime win over Southeast Missouri State. As a redshirt senior, Smith averaged 9.4 points, 7.5 rebounds, and 1.1 assists per game.

== Professional career ==
On September 17, 2020, Smith signed his first professional contract with Borac Čačak of the Basketball League of Serbia. He averaged 6.9 points and 3.8 rebounds per game. On August 15, 2021, Smith signed with Imortal Basket of the Liga Portuguesa de Basquetebol.

On June 29, 2026, he signed with GTK Gliwice of the Polish Basketball League (PLK).
