= Jonathan Stark (basketball) =

American basketball player (born 1995)

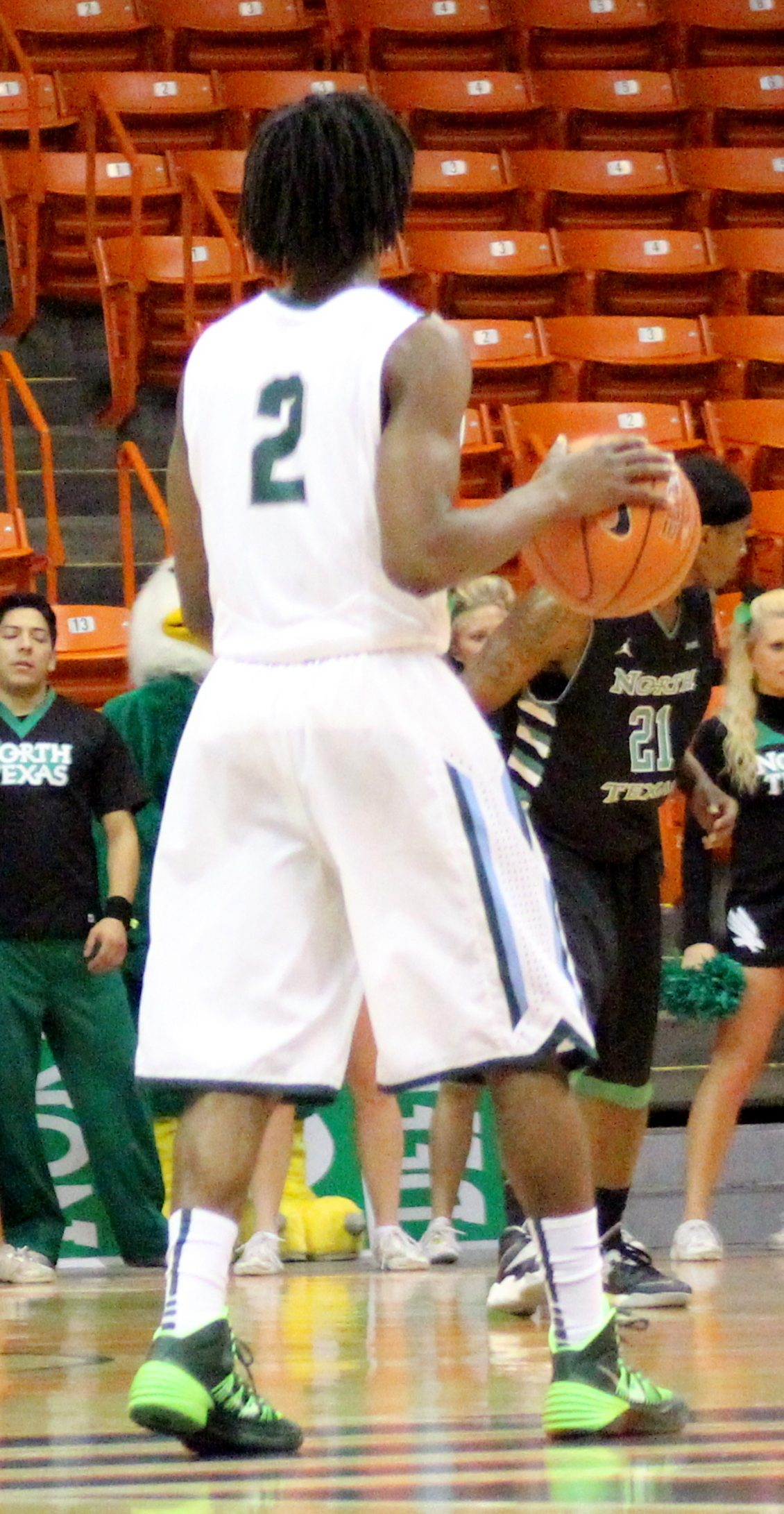
- Stark at Tulane in 2014

No. 2 – CS Dinamo București
- Position: Point guard
- League: Liga Națională

Personal information
- Born: May 23, 1995 (age 31) Munford, Tennessee, U.S.
- Listed height: 6 ft 0 in (1.83 m)
- Listed weight: 180 lb (82 kg)

Career information
- High school: Munford (Munford, Tennessee)
- College: Tulane (2013–2015); Murray State (2016–2018)
- NBA draft: 2018: undrafted
- Playing career: 2018–present

Career history
- 2018–2019: Iowa Wolves
- 2020–2021: Gießen 46ers
- 2021–2022: Alba Fehérvár
- 2022: Legia Warsaw
- 2022–2023: Orléans Loiret
- 2023: Hapoel Haifa
- 2023–2024: Aris Thessaloniki
- 2024–2025: Ehime Orange Vikings
- 2025–present: Dinamo București

Career highlights
- OVC Player of the Year (2018); 2× First-team All-OVC (2017, 2018); OVC tournament MVP (2018)
- Stats at Basketball Reference

Jonathan Stark (born May 23, 1995) is an American professional basketball player for Dinamo București of the Liga Națională. He played college basketball for the Murray State Racers. He attended Munford High School in Munford, Tennessee, graduating in 2013.

== College career ==
Stark played two seasons for Tulane. From his 2013–14 season his freshman year to his sophomore season in 2014–15, Stark saw his minutes drop from 37.2 MPG to 31.8 MPG, which prompted Stark to decide to transfer in 2015. Stark ended up at Murray State and was named to the First Team All-Ohio Valley Conference as a junior. He took his team to the OVC Tournament semi-finals his junior year after scoring 78 points over the span of two games. In his senior season, Stark and fellow senior Terrell Miller had a breakout year for the Racers. Stark tallied 36 points in a victory over Southeast Missouri on January 4, 2018. On January 18, he scored his 2000th point in a loss to Belmont In three of the final four games of the season, he scored more than 30 points to propel the Racers to a 16-2 league record and OVC regular season championship. He led the conference in scoring with 21.7 points per game in addition to 4.0 assists and 1.4 steals per game. At the end of the regular season Stark was named Ohio Valley Conference Player of the Year, the first Murray State player to be honored since Cameron Payne in 2015. He helped lead Murray State to its 16th OVC Championship in 2018 on the heels of a 24-point performance in a win over Belmont. Murray State was paired against West Virginia in the 2018 NCAA Tournament, but guard Jevon Carter held Stark to just 9 points on 1-for-12 shooting from the field. The Racers lost to West Virginia 85–68 in Stark's final game with the Racers.

== Professional career ==
After going undrafted in the 2018 NBA draft, Stark joined the Minnesota Timberwolves in the NBA Summer League. Stark later joined the Timberwolves for training camp. On October 13, 2018, he was waived by the Timberwolves. Stark was added to the Iowa Wolves opening night roster. Stark played 39 games with the Wolves and started 28. He averaged 12.6 points, 5.8 assists and 2.6 rebounds per game. On February 28, 2019, Stark tore his ACL in a game against the Texas Legends, forcing him to miss the 2019–20 season.

On August 20, 2020, Stark signed with the Gießen 46ers in Germany. He averaged 11.7 points, 4.1 assists, and 1.7 rebounds per game. On July 11, 2021, Stark signed with Alba Fehérvár of the Hungarian Nemzeti Bajnokság I/A.

On July 18, 2022, he signed with Legia Warszawa of the Polish Basketball League.
