= Spoonhour =

Spoonhour is a surname. Notable people with the surname include:

- Charlie Spoonhour (1939–2012), American basketball coach
- Jay Spoonhour (born 1970), American basketball coach
