= 2016–17 Austin Peay Governors basketball team =

American college basketball season

2016–17 Austin Peay Governors men's basketball
- Conference: Ohio Valley Conference
- West Division
- Record: 11–19 (7–9 OVC)
- Head coach: Dave Loos (27th season)
- Assistant coaches: Jay Bowen; Kevin Hogan; Julian Terrell
- Home arena: Dunn Center

2016–17 Ohio Valley Conference men's basketball standings
	Conf.				Overall
Team	W		L	PCT	W		L	PCT
East
Belmont	15	–	1	.938	23	–	7	.767
Morehead State	10	–	6	.625	14	–	16	.467
Jacksonville State †	9	–	7	.563	20	–	15	.571
Tennessee State	8	–	8	.500	17	–	13	.567
Tennessee Tech	8	–	8	.500	12	–	20	.375
Eastern Kentucky	5	–	11	.313	12	–	19	.387
West
UT Martin	10	–	6	.625	22	–	13	.629
Southeast Missouri St.	9	–	7	.563	15	–	18	.455
Murray State	8	–	8	.500	16	–	17	.485
Austin Peay	7	–	9	.438	11	–	19	.367
Eastern Illinois	6	–	10	.375	14	–	15	.483
SIU Edwardsville	1	–	15	.063	6	–	24	.200
† 2017 OVC tournament winner

The 2016–17 Austin Peay Governors basketball team represented Austin Peay State University during the 2016–17 NCAA Division I men's basketball season. The Governors, led by 27th-year head coach Dave Loos, played their home games at the Dunn Center in Clarksville, Tennessee and were members of the West Division of the Ohio Valley Conference (OVC). They finished the season 11–19, 7–9 in conference play, to finish in fourth place in the West Division. They failed to qualify for the Ohio Valley Conference tournament.

On March 2, 2017, head coach Dave Loos announced his retirement. He had been undergoing cancer treatment during the season, and had taken a medical leave in January 2017, missing four games. He finished with a 27-year record of 420–410. On April 3, South Carolina assistant Matt Figger was hired as the new head coach of APSU.

== Previous season ==
The Governors finished the 2015–16 season with a record of 18–18, 8–9 in OVC play. They defeated Tennessee Tech, Tennessee State, Belmont and UT Martin to win the OVC Conference tournament as the No. 8 seed. As a result, they received the conference's automatic bid to the NCAA tournament. As a No. 16 seed in the tournament, they lost to Kansas in the first round.

== Preseason ==
In a vote of Ohio Valley Conference head men's basketball coaches and sports information directors, Austin Peay was picked to finish third in the West Division of the conference.

== Roster ==
2016–17 Austin Peay Governors men's basketball team
Players
Coaches

Pos.	#	Name	Height	Weight	Year	Hometown
F/C	1	Assane Diop	6 ft 8 in (2.03 m)	217 lb (98 kg)	Sr	Dakar, Senegal
G/F	2	Jared Savage	6 ft 5 in (1.96 m)	195 lb (88 kg)	So	Bowling Green, KY
F	3	Chris Porter-Bunton	6 ft 5 in (1.96 m)	217 lb (98 kg)	RS So	Bowling Green, KY
G	4	Josh Robinson	6 ft 2 in (1.88 m)	185 lb (84 kg)	Jr	St. Louis, MO
G	10	Tre' Ivory	5 ft 11 in (1.8 m)	185 lb (84 kg)	Jr	Louisville, KY
G	20	Domas Budrys	6 ft 4 in (1.93 m)	185 lb (84 kg)	Jr	Kretinga, Lithuania
G/F	23	Steve Harris	6 ft 4 in (1.93 m)	180 lb (82 kg)	So	St. Louis, MO
F/C	24	Jartavious Dobbs	6 ft 10 in (2.08 m)	205 lb (93 kg)	Fr	Columbus, MS
F	25	Dre'Kalo Clayton	6 ft 6 in (1.98 m)	245 lb (111 kg)	RS Jr	Orlando, FL
G/F	30	Chris Stocks	6 ft 2 in (1.88 m)	185 lb (84 kg)	Fr	Poplar Bluff, MO
G/F	32	John Murry	6 ft 3 in (1.91 m)	195 lb (88 kg)	Sr	Indianapolis, IN
F	42	Kenny Jones	6 ft 6 in (1.98 m)	198 lb (90 kg)	Sr	South Bend, IN
PG	45	Zach Glotta	6 ft 0 in (1.83 m)	185 lb (84 kg)	So	O'Fallon, MO

Head coach

- Dave Loos (Memphis State)

Assistant coach(es)

- Jay Bowen (Christian Brothers)
- Kevin Hogan (Rollins)
- Julian Terrell (Vanderbilt)

Legend

- (C) Team captain
- (S) Suspended
- (I) Ineligible
- (W) Walk-on
- Injured
- Current redshirt

Roster
Last update: June 26, 2024

== Schedule ==
Date time, TV	Opponent	Result	Record	Site (attendance) city, state
Exhibition
11/01/2016*; 7:00 p.m.	Thomas More	W 112–63		Dunn Center (1,377); Clarksville, TN
11/04/2016*; 7:00 p.m.	Sewanee	W 89–72		Dunn Center (1,589); Clarksville, TN
Non-conference regular season
11/11/2016*; 6:00 p.m., TWCSC	at Dayton	L 68–96	0–1	UD Arena (13,121); Dayton, OH
11/14/2016*; 7:00 p.m.	Oakland City (IN)	W 107–67	1–1	Dunn Center (1,592); Clarksville, TN
11/18/2016*; 5:00 p.m.	vs. Northern Kentucky; RedHawk Invitational	W 77–69	2–1	Millett Hall; Oxford, OH
11/19/2016*; 3:30 p.m.	at Miami (OH); RedHawk Invitational	L 70–76	2–2	Millett Hall (1,274); Oxford, OH
11/20/2016*; 12:00 p.m.	vs. Delaware; RedHawk Invitational	W 76–75	3–2	Millett Hall; Oxford, OH
11/26/2016*; 7:00 p.m.	Spalding	W 82–63	4–2	Dunn Center (1,277); Clarksville, TN
11/30/2016*; 7:30 p.m.	IPFW	L 99–103	4–3	Dunn Center (1,748); Clarksville, TN
12/03/2016*; 7:00 p.m.	at Arkansas	L 62–99	4–4	Bud Walton Arena (19,483); Fayetteville, AR
12/10/2016*; 1:00 p.m.	at IPFW	L 58–98	4–5	Memorial Coliseum (1,458); Fort Wayne, IN
12/15/2016*; 6:00 p.m.	at Wofford	L 77–96	4–6	Benjamin Johnson Arena (813); Spartanburg, SC
12/17/2016*; 7:00 p.m.	Evansville	L 69–77	4–7	Dunn Center (1,428); Clarksville, TN
12/20/2016*; 7:00 p.m.	Lipscomb	L 85–99	4–8	Dunn Center (1,467); Clarksville, TN
12/22/2016*; 6:00 p.m., BTN+	at No. 16 Indiana	L 62–97	4–9	Simon Skjodt Assembly Hall (14,688); Bloomington, IN
12/28/2016*; 7:00 p.m.	at Western Kentucky	L 92–97	4–10	E. A. Diddle Arena (3,913); Bowling Green, KY
Ohio Valley Conference regular season
12/31/2016; 2:30 p.m.	Belmont	L 77–82	4–11 (0–1)	Dunn Center (1,757); Clarksville, TN
01/05/2017; 7:30 p.m.	at Tennessee Tech	L 67–76	4–12 (0–2)	Eblen Center (1,493); Cookeville, TN
01/07/2017; 7:00 p.m.	at Jacksonville State	L 68–71	4–13 (0–3)	Pete Mathews Coliseum (1,504); Jacksonville, AL
01/12/2017; 8:00 p.m., CBSSN	at SIU Edwardsville	W 83–81 ^{OT}	5–13 (1–3)	Vadalabene Center (1,057); Edwardsville, IL
01/14/2017; 11:00 a.m., ASN	at Eastern Illinois	W 92–84	6–13 (2–3)	Lantz Arena (1,209); Charleston, IL
01/19/2017; 7:00 p.m.	Morehead State	L 82–89	6–14 (2–4)	Dunn Center (1,767); Clarksville, TN
01/21/2017; 6:30 p.m.	Murray State	W 84–81 ^{OT}	7–14 (3–4)	Dunn Center (4,263); Clarksville, TN
01/26/2017; 8:00 p.m., CBSSN	UT Martin	L 79–85	7–15 (3–5)	Dunn Center (1,863); Clarksville, TN
01/28/2017; 6:30 p.m.	Southeast Missouri State	L 71–82	7–16 (3–6)	Dunn Center (3,794); Clarksville, TN
02/01/2017; 7:00 p.m.	at Eastern Kentucky	W 83–81 ^{OT}	8–16 (4–6)	McBrayer Arena (2,450); Richmond, KY
02/04/2017; 6:30 p.m.	Tennessee State	L 66–70	8–17 (4–7)	Dunn Center (2,995); Clarksville, TN
02/11/2017; 7:00 p.m.	at Murray State	L 58–102	8–18 (4–8)	CFSB Center (4,016); Murray, KY
02/16/2017; 7:00 p.m.	Eastern Illinois	W 85–80	9–18 (5–8)	Dunn Center (1,549); Clarksville, TN
02/18/2017; 6:30 p.m.	SIU Edwardsville	W 92–84	10–18 (6–8)	Dunn Center (2,657); Clarksville, TN
02/23/2017; 7:00 p.m.	at UT Martin	L 72–76	10–19 (6–9)	Skyhawk Arena (1,864); Martin, TN
02/25/2017; 4:15 p.m.	at Southeast Missouri State	W 88–79	11–19 (7–9)	Show Me Center (3,746); Cape Girardeau, MO
*Non-conference game. ^{#}Rankings from AP poll. (#) Tournament seedings in parentheses. All times are in Central.
