= 2016–17 UT Martin Skyhawks men's basketball team =

American college basketball season

2016–17 UT Martin Skyhawks men's basketball

OVC West Division champions

CIT, Second Round
- Conference: Ohio Valley Conference
- West Division
- Record: 22–13 (10–6 OVC)
- Head coach: Anthony Stewart (1st season)
- Assistant coaches: Jermaine Johnson; Alex Ireland; DeAndre Walker
- Home arena: Skyhawk Arena

2016–17 Ohio Valley Conference men's basketball standings
	Conf.				Overall
Team	W		L	PCT	W		L	PCT
East
Belmont	15	–	1	.938	23	–	7	.767
Morehead State	10	–	6	.625	14	–	16	.467
Jacksonville State †	9	–	7	.563	20	–	15	.571
Tennessee State	8	–	8	.500	17	–	13	.567
Tennessee Tech	8	–	8	.500	12	–	20	.375
Eastern Kentucky	5	–	11	.313	12	–	19	.387
West
UT Martin	10	–	6	.625	22	–	13	.629
Southeast Missouri St.	9	–	7	.563	15	–	18	.455
Murray State	8	–	8	.500	16	–	17	.485
Austin Peay	7	–	9	.438	11	–	19	.367
Eastern Illinois	6	–	10	.375	14	–	15	.483
SIU Edwardsville	1	–	15	.063	6	–	24	.200
† 2017 OVC tournament winner

The 2016–17 UT Martin Skyhawks men's basketball team represented the University of Tennessee at Martin during the 2016–17 NCAA Division I men's basketball season. The Skyhawks, led by first-year head coach Anthony Stewart, played their home games at Skyhawk Arena as members of the West Division of the Ohio Valley Conference. They finished the season 22–13, 10–6 in OVC play to win the West Division championship. As the No. 2 seed in the OVC tournament, they defeated Murray State before losing to Jacksonville State in the championship game. They were invited to the CollegeInsider.com Tournament where they defeated UNC Asheville in the first round before losing in the second round to Campbell.

== Previous season ==
The Skyhawks finished the 2015–16 season 20–15, 10–6 in OVC play to share the West Division championship with Murray State. They defeated Morehead State to advance to the championship game of the OVC tournament where they lost to Austin Peay. They were invited to the CollegeInsider.com Tournament where they defeated Central Michigan in the first round before losing in the second round to Ball State.

Following the season, head coach Heath Schroyer left UT Martin to become an assistant at NC State. Anthony Stewart was named interim head coach and had the interim tag removed in November 2016.

== Preseason ==
In a vote of Ohio Valley Conference head men’s basketball coaches and sports information directors, UT Martin was picked to finish fourth in the West Division of the OVC.

== Roster ==
2016–17 UT Martin Skyhawks men's basketball team
Players
Coaches

Pos.	#	Name	Height	Weight	Year	Previous school	Hometown
G	0	Jalen Jackson	6 ft 1 in (1.85 m)	160 lb (73 kg)	RS Jr	Neosho County CC	Cleveland, Ohio
G	1	Matthew Butler	6 ft 2 in (1.88 m)	185 lb (84 kg)	RS Jr	Rhode Island	Memphis, Tennessee
G	2	Jacolby Mobley	6 ft 0 in (1.83 m)	160 lb (73 kg)	Sr	Chattanooga	Starkville, Mississippi
F	3	Dante Bailey	6 ft 6 in (1.98 m)	180 lb (82 kg)	Jr	Seminole State College	Chicago, Illinois
F	4	Kedar Edwards	6 ft 5 in (1.96 m)	200 lb (91 kg)	Sr	State Fair CC	Brooklyn, New York
F	5	Mike Fofana	6 ft 8 in (2.03 m)	190 lb (86 kg)	Fr	Whitehaven HS	Memphis, Tennessee
F	10	Chandler Rowe	6 ft 7 in (2.01 m)	205 lb (93 kg)	Sr	North Central HS	Atlanta, Georgia
G	11	A. J. Nywesh	6 ft 4 in (1.93 m)	175 lb (79 kg)	Jr	Lake Region State College	Austin, Minnesota
F	12	Fatodd Lewis	6 ft 8 in (2.03 m)	215 lb (98 kg)	RS So	Raleigh-Egypt HS	Memphis, Tennessee
G	13	Malik Pugh	6 ft 1 in (1.85 m)	165 lb (75 kg)	RS So	UNC Wilmington	Dyersburg, Tennessee
G	14	Travaun Pugh	6 ft 1 in (1.85 m)	170 lb (77 kg)	RS Jr	Midland College	West Lawn, Pennsylvania
F	21	Malik London	6 ft 8 in (2.03 m)	190 lb (86 kg)	Sr	Missouri State-West Plains	Jackson Hamlet, North Carolina
F	25	Javier Martinez	6 ft 7 in (2.01 m)	210 lb (95 kg)	Sr	St. Louis Christian Academy	St. Croix, Virgin Islands
F	33	Nehemiah Mabson	6 ft 6 in (1.98 m)	250 lb (113 kg)	Jr	New Mexico Military Institute	Lexington, Kentucky
C	44	Nick Detlev	7 ft 2 in (2.18 m)	225 lb (102 kg)	RS So	Andrews Osborne Academy	Euclid, Ohio

Head coach

- Anthony Stewart (Mount Union)

Assistant coach(es)

- Jermaine Johnson (United States Sports Academy)
- Alex Ireland (Valdosta State)
- DeAndre Walker (Fairmont State)

Legend

- (C) Team captain
- (S) Suspended
- (I) Ineligible
- (W) Walk-on
- Injured
- Current redshirt

Roster

== Schedule and results ==
Date time, TV	Rank^{#}	Opponent^{#}	Result	Record	Site (attendance) city, state
Exhibition
11/07/2016*; 7:30 pm		Transylvania	W 89–74		Skyhawk Arena; Martin, TN
Non–conference regular season
11/11/2016*; 6:00 pm		at Ole Miss	L 83–86	0–1	The Pavilion at Ole Miss (6,123); Oxford, MS
11/13/2016*; 6:00 pm		Texas–Rio Grande Valley	W 88–80	1–1	Skyhawk Arena (1,094); Martin, TN
11/15/2016*; 7:00 pm		Cumberland	W 95–64	2–1	Skyhawk Arena (1,067); Martin, TN
11/18/2016*; 7:00 pm		Cleveland State; Bluegrass Showcase	W 85–74	3–1	Skyhawk Arena (1,520); Martin, TN
11/21/2016*; 6:00 pm		at Canisius; Bluegrass Showcase	W 72–69	4–1	Koessler Athletic Center (1,291); Buffalo, NY
11/23/2016*; 6:00 pm		at Duquesne; Bluegrass Showcase	W 66–63	5–1	Palumbo Center (825); Pittsburgh, PA
11/25/2016*; 6:00 pm, SECN		at No. 1 Kentucky; Bluegrass Showcase	L 76–111	5–2	Rupp Arena (23,324); Lexington, KY
11/29/2016*; 7:30 pm		Florida Atlantic	W 82–81	6–2	Skyhawk Arena (1,377); Martin, TN
12/01/2016*; 7:00 pm		at Arkansas–Pine Bluff	W 73–68	7–2	K. L. Johnson Complex (678); Pine Bluff, AR
12/04/2016*; 2:00 pm		Boyce	W 108–64	8–2	Skyhawk Arena (844); Martin, TN
12/10/2016*; 2:00 pm		at Illinois State	L 57–74	8–3	Redbird Arena (4,275); Normal, IL
12/14/2016*; 7:00 pm		Arkansas State	L 68–87	8–4	Skyhawk Arena (1,098); Martin, TN
12/17/2016*; 7:00 pm		Bethune–Cookman	W 97–72	9–4	Skyhawk Arena (896); Martin, TN
12/20/2016*; 7:35 pm		at UMKC	W 77–66	10–4	Municipal Auditorium (1,048); Kansas City, MO
12/22/2016*; 7:00 pm		at Southern Illinois	L 70–78	10–5	SIU Arena (4,280); Carbondale, IL
Ohio Valley Conference regular season
12/29/2016; 7:30 pm		Jacksonville State	L 72–90	10–6 (0–1)	Skyhawk Arena (1,604); Martin, TN
12/31/2016; 6:00 pm		Morehead State	W 81–77 ^{OT}	11–6 (1–1)	Skyhawk Arena (1,730); Martin, TN
01/05/2017; 6:00 pm		at Belmont	L 67–83	11–7 (1–2)	Curb Event Center (1,746); Nashville, TN
01/07/2017; 7:30 pm		at Tennessee State	L 65–76	11–8 (1–3)	Gentry Complex; Nashville, TN
01/14/2017; 6:00 pm		Southeast Missouri State	W 79–69	12–8 (2–3)	Skyhawk Arena (2,068); Martin, TN
01/19/2017; 7:00 pm		Eastern Illinois	W 82–71 ^{2OT}	13–8 (3–3)	Skyhawk Arena (1,507); Martin, TN
01/21/2017; 6:00 pm		SIU Edwardsville	W 75–67	14–8 (4–3)	Skyhawk Arena (2,047); Martin, TN
01/26/2017; 8:00 pm, CBSSN		at Austin Peay	W 85–79	15–8 (5–3)	Dunn Center (1,863); Clarksville, TN
01/28/2017; 7:00 pm		at Murray State	L 86–94	15–9 (5–4)	CFSB Center (3,909); Murray, KY
02/01/2017; 7:30 pm		at Tennessee Tech	W 75–46	16–9 (6–4)	Eblen Center (1,555); Cookeville, TN
02/04/2017; 6:00 pm		Eastern Kentucky	W 85–68	17–9 (7–4)	Skyhawk Arena (2,103); Martin, TN
02/09/2017; 7:00 pm		at Eastern Illinois	L 71–81	17–10 (7–5)	Lantz Arena (1,678); Charleston, IL
02/11/2017; 7:00 pm		at SIU Edwardsville	W 80–73	18–10 (8–5)	Vadalabene Center (1,156); Edwardsville, IL
02/18/2017; 11:00 am, ASN		at Southeast Missouri State	L 61–90	18–11 (8–6)	Show Me Center (3,160); Cape Girardeau, MO
02/23/2017; 7:00 pm		Austin Peay	W 76–72	19–11 (9–6)	Skyhawk Arena (1,864); Martin, TN
02/25/2017; 6:00 pm		Murray State	W 83–76	20–11 (10–6)	Skyhawk Arena (3,314); Martin, TN
Ohio Valley Conference tournament
03/03/2017; 9:00 pm, ESPNU	(2)	vs. (7) Murray State; Semifinals	W 73–67	21–11	Nashville Municipal Auditorium (2,355); Nashville, TN
03/04/2017; 9:00 pm, ESPN2	(2)	vs. (4) Jacksonville State; Championship game	L 55–66	21–12	Nashville Municipal Auditorium (1,303); Nashville, TN
CIT
03/16/2017*; 7:00 pm, Facebook Live		UNC Asheville; First Round	W 89–75	22–12	Skyhawk Arena (504); Martin, TN
03/20/2017*; 6:00 pm, Facebook Live		at Campbell; Second Round	L 56–73	22–13	Gore Arena (2,031); Buies Creek, NC
*Non-conference game. ^{#}Rankings from AP Poll. (#) Tournament seedings in parentheses. All times are in Central Time.
