= 2016–17 Southeast Missouri State Redhawks men's basketball team =

American college basketball season

2016–17 Southeast Missouri State Redhawks men's basketball
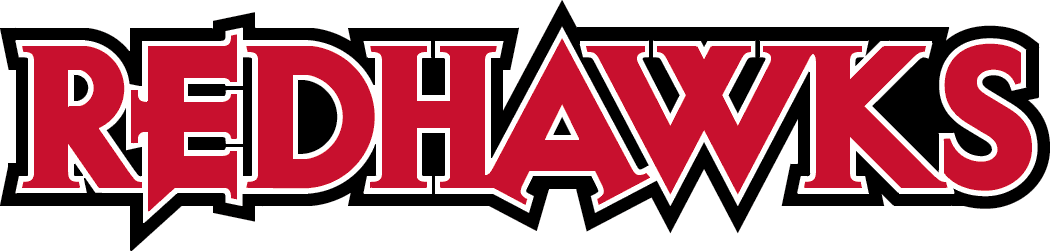
- Conference: Ohio Valley Conference
- West Division
- Record: 15–18 (9–7 OVC)
- Head coach: Rick Ray (2nd season)
- Assistant coaches: Adam Gordon; Chris Moore; Nick Lagroone
- Home arena: Show Me Center

2016–17 Ohio Valley Conference men's basketball standings
	Conf.				Overall
Team	W		L	PCT	W		L	PCT
East
Belmont	15	–	1	.938	23	–	7	.767
Morehead State	10	–	6	.625	14	–	16	.467
Jacksonville State †	9	–	7	.563	20	–	15	.571
Tennessee State	8	–	8	.500	17	–	13	.567
Tennessee Tech	8	–	8	.500	12	–	20	.375
Eastern Kentucky	5	–	11	.313	12	–	19	.387
West
UT Martin	10	–	6	.625	22	–	13	.629
Southeast Missouri St.	9	–	7	.563	15	–	18	.455
Murray State	8	–	8	.500	16	–	17	.485
Austin Peay	7	–	9	.438	11	–	19	.367
Eastern Illinois	6	–	10	.375	14	–	15	.483
SIU Edwardsville	1	–	15	.063	6	–	24	.200
† 2017 OVC tournament winner

The 2016–17 Southeast Missouri State Redhawks men's basketball team represented Southeast Missouri State University during the 2016–17 NCAA Division I men's basketball season. The Redhawks, led by second-year head coach Rick Ray, played their home games at the Show Me Center in Cape Girardeau, Missouri as members of the West Division of the Ohio Valley Conference. They finished the season 15–18, 9–7 in OVC play to finish in second place in the West Division. They defeated Tennessee State in the first round of the OVC tournament to advance to the quarterfinals where they lost to Jacksonville State.

== Previous season ==
The Redhawks finished the 2015–16 season 5–24, 2–14 in OVC play to finish in last place in the West Division. As a result, they failed to qualify for the OVC tournament.

== Preseaon ==
In a vote of Ohio Valley Conference head men’s basketball coaches and sports information directors, Southeast Missouri State was picked to finish last in the West Division of the OVC.

== Roster ==
2016–17 Southeast Missouri State Redhawks men's basketball team
Players
Coaches

Pos.	#	Name	Height	Weight	Year	Hometown
G	0	Dondre Duffus	6 ft 3 in (1.91 m)	183 lb (83 kg)	Jr	Palm Beach, Florida
G	1	Antonius Cleveland	6 ft 6 in (1.98 m)	195 lb (88 kg)	Sr	Memphis, Tennessee
G	2	Tahj Eaddy	6 ft 2 in (1.88 m)	154 lb (70 kg)	Fr	West Haven, Connecticut
G	3	Ray Kowalski	6 ft 3 in (1.91 m)	195 lb (88 kg)	Fr	Concord, North Carolina
G	4	Milos Vranes	6 ft 7 in (2.01 m)	200 lb (91 kg)	Jr	Belgrade, Serbia
F	5	Joel Angus III	6 ft 7 in (2.01 m)	240 lb (109 kg)	Sr	Brooklyn, New York
G	10	Jonathan Dalton	5 ft 10 in (1.78 m)	155 lb (70 kg)	So	New Orleans, Louisiana
G	11	Eli Sample	6 ft 4 in (1.93 m)	184 lb (83 kg)	Sr	Crystal City, Missouri
G	12	Jamaal Calvin	6 ft 1 in (1.85 m)	184 lb (83 kg)	Sr	Chattanooga, Tennessee
F	13	Trey Kellum	6 ft 7 in (2.01 m)	213 lb (97 kg)	RS Sr	Peoria, Illinois
G	15	Donnie Lewis	6 ft 1 in (1.85 m)	170 lb (77 kg)	So	Lexington, Kentucky
G	22	Jaylen Benton	6 ft 3 in (1.91 m)	180 lb (82 kg)	Jr	Columbus, Ohio
G	23	Daniel Simmons	6 ft 2 in (1.88 m)	204 lb (93 kg)	Jr	Biggersville, Mississippi
G	34	Denzel Mahoney	6 ft 4 in (1.93 m)	213 lb (97 kg)	Fr	Oviedo, Florida
F	35	William Tchiengang	6 ft 8 in (2.03 m)	227 lb (103 kg)	Jr	Yaoundé, Cameroon

Head coach

- Rick Ray (Grand View College)

Assistant coach(es)

- Adam Gordon (Tampa)
- Chris Moore (Kentucky State)
- Nick Lagroone (Southern Wesleyan)

Legend

- (C) Team captain
- (S) Suspended
- (I) Ineligible
- (W) Walk-on
- Injured
- Current redshirt

Roster

== Schedule and results ==
Date time, TV	Rank^{#}	Opponent^{#}	Result	Record	Site (attendance) city, state
Exhibition
11/07/2016*; 6:30 pm		Missouri S&T	W 84–77		Show Me Center (512); Cape Girardeau, MO
Non-conference regular season
11/11/2016*; 8:00 pm, BTN		at Illinois	L 62–81	0–1	State Farm Center (19,790); Champaign, IL
11/13/2016*; 2:00 pm		Hannibal–LaGrange	W 86–54	1–1	Show Me Center (807); Cape Girardeau, MO
11/16/2016*; 7:00 pm		at Western Illinois	W 74–71	2–1	Western Hall (807); Macomb, IL
11/18/2016*; 7:00 pm		at Bradley	L 78–84	2–2	Carver Arena (5,142); Peoria, IL
11/22/2016*; 6:30 pm		UTRGV	W 83–72	3–2	Show Me Center (1,139); Cape Girardeau, MO
11/28/2016*; 6:35 pm		at UMKC	L 75–86	3–3	Municipal Auditorium (976); Kansas City, MO
12/01/2016*; 6:30 pm		Central Arkansas	W 87–63	4–3	Show Me Center (1,437); Cape Girardeau, MO
12/04/2016*; 3:00 pm, ESPN2		at No. 13 Indiana	L 55–83	4–4	Assembly Hall (17,222); Bloomington, IN
12/07/2016*; 6:30 pm, ESPN3		Missouri State	L 71–79	4–5	Show Me Center (1,556); Cape Girardeau, MO
12/10/2016*; 2:00 pm		Northern Kentucky	L 66–80	4–6	Show Me Center (1,379); Cape Girardeau, MO
12/17/2016*; 5:05 pm		at Missouri State; Las Vegas Classic	L 66–71	4–7	JQH Arena (2,384); Springfield, MO
12/19/2016*; 8:00 pm, FS1		at DePaul; Las Vegas Classic	L 78–81	4–8	Allstate Arena (4,377); Rosemont, IL
12/22/2016*; 2:00 pm		vs. Chicago State; Las Vegas Classic	L 65–74	4–9	Orleans Arena; Paradise, NV
12/23/2016*; 2:00 pm		vs. Cornell; Las Vegas Classic	L 62–78	4–10	Orleans Arena; Paradise, NV
12/29/2016*; 5:00 pm		Henderson State	W 89–75	5–10	Show Me Center (955); Cape Girardeau, MO
Ohio Valley Conference regular season
12/31/2016; 2:30 pm		Eastern Kentucky	W 81–48	6–10 (1–0)	Show Me Center (720); Cape Girardeau, MO
01/05/2017; 7:30 pm		at Tennessee State	L 62–65	6–11 (1–1)	Gentry Complex (613); Nashville, TN
01/07/2017; 7:00 pm		at Belmont	L 75–87	6–12 (1–2)	Curb Event Center (2,017); Nashville, TN
01/10/2017; 6:30 pm		Tennessee Tech	W 83–78	7–12 (2–2)	Show Me Center (923); Cape Girardeau, MO
01/14/2017; 6:00 pm		at UT Martin	L 69–79	7–13 (2–3)	Skyhawk Arena (2,068); Martin, TN
01/19/2017; 6:30 pm		SIU Edwardsville	W 79–76	8–13 (3–3)	Show Me Center (1,372); Cape Girardeau, MO
01/21/2017; 4:15 pm		Eastern Illinois	W 83–71	9–13 (4–3)	Show Me Center (1,968); Cape Girardeau, MO
01/26/2017; 7:00 pm		at Murray State	W 75–74	10–13 (5–3)	CFSB Center (3,080); Murray, KY
01/28/2017; 6:30 pm		at Austin Peay	W 82–71	11–13 (6–3)	Dunn Center (3,794); Cookeville, TN
02/01/2017; 7:00 pm		at Jacksonville State	L 62–74	11–14 (6–4)	Pete Mathews Coliseum (1,011); Jacksonville, AL
02/04/2017; 4:15 pm		Morehead State	L 81–89	11–15 (6–5)	Show Me Center (2,919); Cape Girardeau, MO
02/09/2017; 7:00 pm		at SIU Edwardsville	W 71–67	12–15 (7–5)	Vadalabene Center (1,161); Edwardsville, IL
02/11/2017; 1:00 pm, ASN		at Eastern Illinois	L 80–86 ^{OT}	12–16 (7–6)	Lantz Arena (1,992); Charleston, IL
02/18/2017; 11:00 am, ASN		UT Martin	W 90–61	13–16 (8–6)	Show Me Center (3,160); Cape Girardeau, MO
02/23/2017; 6:30 pm		Murray State	W 82–69	14–16 (9–6)	Show Me Center (5,225); Cape Girardeau, MO
02/25/2017; 4:15 pm		Austin Peay	L 79–88	14–17 (9–7)	Show Me Center (3,746); Cape Girardeau, MO
Ohio Valley Conference tournament
03/01/2017; 6:30 pm	(5)	vs. (8) Tennessee State; First Round	W 78–75 ^{OT}	15–17	Nashville Municipal Auditorium (1,043); Nashville, TN
03/02/2017; 6:30 pm	(5)	vs. (4) Jacksonville State; Quarterfinals	L 51–74	15–18	Nashville Municipal Auditorium (1,001); Nashville, TN
*Non-conference game. ^{#}Rankings from AP Poll. (#) Tournament seedings in parentheses. All times are in Central Time Source.
