= 2016–17 SIU Edwardsville Cougars men's basketball team =

American college basketball season

2016–17 SIU Edwardsville Cougars men's basketball
- Conference: Ohio Valley Conference
- West Division
- Record: 6–24 (1–15 OVC)
- Head coach: Jon Harris (2nd season)
- Assistant coaches: Kent Williams; Bubba Wells; Tarrance Crump; Yemi Makanjuola (GA)
- Home arena: Vadalabene Center

2016–17 Ohio Valley Conference men's basketball standings
	Conf.				Overall
Team	W		L	PCT	W		L	PCT
East
Belmont	15	–	1	.938	23	–	7	.767
Morehead State	10	–	6	.625	14	–	16	.467
Jacksonville State †	9	–	7	.563	20	–	15	.571
Tennessee State	8	–	8	.500	17	–	13	.567
Tennessee Tech	8	–	8	.500	12	–	20	.375
Eastern Kentucky	5	–	11	.313	12	–	19	.387
West
UT Martin	10	–	6	.625	22	–	13	.629
Southeast Missouri St.	9	–	7	.563	15	–	18	.455
Murray State	8	–	8	.500	16	–	17	.485
Austin Peay	7	–	9	.438	11	–	19	.367
Eastern Illinois	6	–	10	.375	14	–	15	.483
SIU Edwardsville	1	–	15	.063	6	–	24	.200
† 2017 OVC tournament winner

The 2016–17 SIU Edwardsville Cougars men's basketball team represented Southern Illinois University Edwardsville during the 2016–17 NCAA Division I men's basketball season. The Cougars, led by second year head coach Jon Harris, played their home games at the Vadalabene Center in Edwardsville, Illinois as members of the West Division of the Ohio Valley Conference. They finished the season 6–24, 1–15 in OVC play to finish in last place in the West Division. They failed to qualify for the Ohio Valley Conference tournament.

== Previous season ==
The Cougars finished the 2015–16 season 6–22, 3–13 in OVC play to finish in fifth place in the West Division. They failed to qualify for the OVC tournament.

== Preseason ==
Six players, all of whom saw major playing time, returned from the 6–22 team of 2015–16. They were joined by two players who sat out last season as "redshirts" under NCAA transfer rules, four freshmen, and two walk-on players who earned roster spots in open tryouts. A fifth freshman joined the squad at the semester break, and he, another freshman, and a transfer student were redshirted. The one non-returning player transferred to a Division II school.

In a vote of Ohio Valley Conference head men’s basketball coaches and sports information directors, SIUE was picked to finish fifth in the OVC's West Division.

With a forbidding foreboding, the Cougars lost their only exhibition game at home to the Division II McKendree Bearcats.

== Regular season ==
The season started on a positive note with two wins at Hawaii. The Cougars then lost three in a row before winning two to raise their record to 4–3. They then lost the next six games (including another Division II loss) before beating Divisions II Missouri S&T in the final non-conference game.

The conference slate was a near-total disaster, as the Cougars pulled out their only OVC win in their last game on Senior Night. With a 1–15 OVC record, SIUE did not qualify for the conference tournament.

== Roster ==
2016–17 SIU Edwardsville Cougars men's basketball team
Players
Coaches

Pos.	#	Name	Height	Weight	Year	Previous school	Hometown
G	0	Carlos Anderson	6 ft 4 in (1.93 m)	205 lb (93 kg)	So	Alton	Alton, IL
G	1	Burak Eslik	6 ft 4 in (1.93 m)	185 lb (84 kg)	Sr	Lewis and Clark/Fayetteville Christian	Istanbul, Turkey
F	2	Devin Thornton	6 ft 5 in (1.96 m)	225 lb (102 kg)	Sr	Shawnee/Germantown	Memphis, TN
G	3	Tre Harris	6 ft 5 in (1.96 m)	195 lb (88 kg)	RS So	Kansas State/Edwardsville	Edwardsville, IL
G	5	Kevion Stewart (redshirt)	6 ft 3 in (1.91 m)	175 lb (79 kg)	Fr	Cordova HS	Memphis, TN
F	10	Bill Awet † (redshirt)	6 ft 8 in (2.03 m)	200 lb (91 kg)	Fr	Victory Rock Prep	Sydney, Australia
C	11	Glen Pierre, Jr.	6 ft 11 in (2.11 m)	230 lb (104 kg)	RS Jr	College of Charleston/Oldsmar Christian	Orlando, FL
G	13	Christian Ellis	6 ft 2 in (1.88 m)	190 lb (86 kg)	Fr	Modesto Christian	Oakland, CA
G	15	Josh White	6 ft 1 in (1.85 m)	185 lb (84 kg)	RS Sr	South Dakota State/Edwardsville	Edwardsville, IL
F	20	Luka Radovic (W)	6 ft 8 in (2.03 m)	230 lb (104 kg)	Jr	Quincy	Belgrade, Serbia
G	22	Justin Benton	6 ft 4 in (1.93 m)	170 lb (77 kg)	Fr	Houston	Memphis, TN
F	24	Jalen Henry	6 ft 8 in (2.03 m)	220 lb (100 kg)	Jr	Southeast	Springfield, IL
F	32	Brandon Jackson	6 ft 7 in (2.01 m)	205 lb (93 kg)	Fr	Cardinal Ritter	East St. Louis, IL
G	33	D'Quan Applewhite (W)	6 ft 3 in (1.91 m)	180 lb (82 kg)	So	Thornton Township	Harvey, IL
F/C	34	Julian Torres (redshirt)	6 ft 9 in (2.06 m)	265 lb (120 kg)	So	UIC/Bolingbrook	Bolingbrook, IL
F	45	Keenan Simmons	6 ft 6 in (1.98 m)	185 lb (84 kg)	Jr	Michigan City	Michigan City, IN
		†=Joined team mid-season	—	—

Head coach

- Jon Harris

Assistant coach(es)

- Kent Williams
- Bubba Wells
- Tarrance Crump
- Yemi Makanjuola (GA)

Legend

- (C) Team captain
- (S) Suspended
- (I) Ineligible
- (W) Walk-on
- Injured
- Current redshirt

Roster
Last update: 01/15/2017

== Schedule and results ==
Date time, TV	Opponent	Result	Record	High points	High rebounds	High assists	Site (attendance) city, state
Exhibition
11/05/2016*; 7:00 pm, OVCDN	McKendree	L 84–91		18 – Eslik	10 – Anderson, Thornton	5 – Ellis	Vadalabene Center (1,256); Edwardsville, IL
Non-conference regular season
11/12/2016*; 2:00 am	at Hawaii; Rainbow Classic	W 69–68	1–0	13 – Harris	13 – Simmons	4 – Ellis	Stan Sheriff Center (5,423); Honolulu, HI
11/13/2016*; 7:30 pm	vs. Florida Atlantic; Rainbow Classic	W 77–68	2–0	15 – Anderson	14 – Simmons	2 – Anderson, Benton, Harris	Stan Sheriff Center; Honolulu, HI
11/14/2016*; 11:00 pm	vs. Texas State; Rainbow Classic	L 58–86	2–1	19 – Harris	5 – Anderson	2 – Eslik	Stan Sheriff Center (110); Honolulu, HI
11/18/2016; 7:00 pm, FSMW, OVCDN	SIU Carbondale	L 83–101	2–2	24 – Harris	6 – Ellis	6 – Ellis	Vadalabene Center (3,017); Edwardsville, IL
11/22/2016*; 7:30 pm	at Arkansas State	L 57–75	2–3	13 – Ellis	7 – Simmons	3 – Ellis	Convocation Center (2,366); Jonesboro, AR
11/26/2016*; 1:00 pm, FSMW, OVCDN	IUPUI	W 61–58	3–3	13 – Eslik	8 – Henry	4 – Ellis	Vadalabene Center (1,028); Edwardsville, IL
11/28/2016*; 8:00 pm	at Grand Canyon	W 76–64	4–3	18 – Anderson	12 – Simmons	5 – Ellis	GCU Arena (6,007); Phoenix, AZ
12/02/2016*; 6:00 pm, ESPN3	at No. 13 Indiana	L 60–83	4–4	18 – Eslik	7 – Ellis	3 – Anderson	Simon Skjodt Assembly Hall (17,222); Bloomington, IN
12/07/2016*; 8:00 pm, FSMW, OVCDN	Stetson	L 72–80	4–5	28 – Henry	11 – Henry	4 – Ellis, Eslik	Vadalabene Center (1,007); Edwardsville, IL
12/10/2016*; 8:00 pm, OVCDN	Missouri Western	L 44–49	4–6	13 – Henry	9 – Simmons	3 – Eslik	Vadalabene Center (955); Edwardsville, IL
12/17/2016*; 4:00 pm, FSMW, OVCDN	at Saint Louis	L 58–72	4–7	14 – Anderson	9 – Simmons	8 – Ellis	Chaifetz Arena (2,968); St. Louis, MO
12/19/2016*; 7:00 pm, ESPN3	at Green Bay	L 92–94 ^{OT}	4–8	26 – Anderson	10 – Simmons	3 – Ellis, Benton	Resch Center (1,858); Green Bay, WI
12/21/2016*; 7:30 pm, FS1	at Marquette	L 56–89	4–9	14 – Henry	9 – Simmons	5 – Ellis	BMO Harris Bradley Center (11,925); Milwaukee, WI
12/28/2016*; 7:00 pm, OVCDN	Missouri S&T	W 85–67	5–9	30 – Eslik	12 – Henry	4 – Eslik	Vadalabene Center (1,071); Edwardsville, IL
Ohio Valley Conference regular season
12/31/2016; 2:30 pm, OVCDN	Tennessee Tech	L 66–72	5–10 (0–1)	19 – Henry	7 – Henry	3 – Eslik, Ellis	Vadalabene Center (1,781); Edwardsville, IL
01/05/2017; 7:00 pm, OVCDN	at Eastern Kentucky	L 61–78	5–11 (0–2)	21 – Harris	6 – Anderson, Eslik, Henry	3 – Eslk	McBrayer Arena (1,200); Richmond, KY
01/07/17; 3:15 pm, OVCDN	at Morehead State	L 65–73	5–12 (0–3)	20 – Eslik	8 – Ellis, Simmons	4 – Ellis	Ellis Johnson Arena (2,531); Morehead, KY
01/12/2017; 8:00 pm, CBSSN	Austin Peay	L 81–83 ^{OT}	5–13 (0–4)	20 – Eslik	12 – Simmons	2 – Eslik, White	Vadalabene Center (1,057); Edwardsville, IL
01/14/2017; 7:00 pm, FSMW, OVCDN	Murray State	L 59–67	5–14 (0–5)	15 – Harris	7 – White	3 – Anderson	Vadalabene Center (1,372); Edwardsville, IL
01/19/2017; 6:30 pm, OVCDN	at Southeast Missouri State	L 76–79	5–15 (0–6)	25 – Harris	8 – Harris, Jackson	4 – Eslik	Show Me Center (1,372); Cape Girardeau, MO
01/21/2017; 6:30 pm, OVCDN	at UT Martin	L 67–75	5–16 (0–7)	18 – Harris	7 – Harris	3 – White	Skyhawk Arena (2,047); Martin, TN
01/25/2017; 7:00 pm, OVCDN	Tennessee State	L 56–76	5–17 (0–8)	15 – Anderson	7 – Simmons	4 – Ellis	Vadalabene Center (1,011); Edwardsville, IL
01/28/2017; 3:15 pm, OVCDN	at Eastern Illinois	L 60–75	5–18 (0–9)	16 – Henry	8 – Simmons	8 – Benton	Lantz Arena (1,417); Charleston, IL
01/30/2017; 8:00 pm, CBSSN, OVCDN	at Belmont	L 69–92	5–19 (0–10)	18 – Eslik	8 – Simmons	4 – Ellis	Curb Event Center (1,230); Nashville, TN
02/04/2017; 4:00 pm, FSMW, OVCDN	Jacksonville State	L 61–72	5–20 (0–11)	21 – Eslik	6 – Henry, Jackson	4 – Eslik	Vadalabene Center (1,203); Edwardsville, IL
02/09/2017; 7:00 pm, FSMW, OVCDN	Southeast Missouri State	L 67–71	5–21 (0–12)	22 – Henry	9 – Henry	2 – Henry	Vadalabene Center (1,161); Edwardsville, IL
02/11/2017; 4:00 pm, FSMW, OVCDN	UT Martin	L 73–80	5–22 (0–13)	25 – Eslik	7 – Simmons	6 – Ellis	Vadalabene Center (1,156); Edwardsville, IL
02/16/2017; 6:00 pm, ESPNU, OVCDN	at Murray State	L 73–84	5–23 (0–14)	19 – Eslik, Thornton	7 – Ellis	6 – Ellis	CFSB Center (2,974); Murray, KY
02/18/2017; 6:30 pm, OVCDN	at Austin Peay	L 84–92	5–24 (0–15)	21 – Henry	8 – Henry, Thornton	2 – Anderson, Benton	Dunn Center (2,657); Clarksville, TN
02/25/2017; 7:00 pm, FSMW, OVCDN	Eastern Illinois	W 78–59	6–24 (1–15)	22 – Eslik	7 – Ellis	3 – Benton, Ellis	Vadalabene Center (1,805); Edwardsville, IL
*Non-conference game. ^{#}Rankings from AP Poll. (#) Tournament seedings in parentheses. All times are in Central Time Source.
