= 2016–17 Tennessee State Tigers basketball team =

American college basketball season

2016–17 Tennessee State Tigers basketball

Cable Car Classic champions
- Conference: Ohio Valley Conference
- East Division
- Record: 17–13 (8–8 OVC)
- Head coach: Dana Ford (3rd season)
- Assistant coaches: Randy Peele; Rodney Hamilton; Pierre Jordan
- Home arena: Gentry Complex

2016–17 Ohio Valley Conference men's basketball standings
	Conf.				Overall
Team	W		L	PCT	W		L	PCT
East
Belmont	15	–	1	.938	23	–	7	.767
Morehead State	10	–	6	.625	14	–	16	.467
Jacksonville State †	9	–	7	.563	20	–	15	.571
Tennessee State	8	–	8	.500	17	–	13	.567
Tennessee Tech	8	–	8	.500	12	–	20	.375
Eastern Kentucky	5	–	11	.313	12	–	19	.387
West
UT Martin	10	–	6	.625	22	–	13	.629
Southeast Missouri St.	9	–	7	.563	15	–	18	.455
Murray State	8	–	8	.500	16	–	17	.485
Austin Peay	7	–	9	.438	11	–	19	.367
Eastern Illinois	6	–	10	.375	14	–	15	.483
SIU Edwardsville	1	–	15	.063	6	–	24	.200
† 2017 OVC tournament winner

The 2016–17 Tennessee State Tigers basketball team represented Tennessee State University during the 2016–17 NCAA Division I men's basketball season. The Tigers, led by third-year head coach Dana Ford, played their home games at the Gentry Complex in Nashville, Tennessee as members of the East Division of the Ohio Valley Conference. They finished the season 17–13, 8–8 in OVC play to finish in a tie for fourth place in the East Division. As the No. 8 seed in the OVC tournament, they lost to Southeast Missouri State in the first round.

== Previous season ==
The Tigers finished the 2015–16 season 20–11, 11–5 in OVC play to finish in a three-way tie for second place in the East Division. They lost in the quarterfinals of the OVC tournament to Austin Peay. They were invited to the CollegeInsider.com Tournament where they lost in the first round to Ball State.

== Preseason ==
In a vote of Ohio Valley Conference head men’s basketball coaches and sports information directors, Tennessee State was picked to finish in second place in the East Division of the OVC. Tahjere McCall and Wayne Martin were selected to the All-OVC Preseason Team.

== Roster ==
2016–17 Tennessee State Tigers men's basketball team
Players
Coaches

Pos.	#	Name	Height	Weight	Year	Hometown
G	0	Armani Chaney	5 ft 10 in (1.78 m)	165 lb (75 kg)	So	Chicago, Illinois
G	1	Delano Spencer	6 ft 3 in (1.91 m)	195 lb (88 kg)	Jr	Atlanta, Georgia
G	2	Chris Bolden	6 ft 3 in (1.91 m)	215 lb (98 kg)	RS Sr	Tifton, Georgia
G	3	Jordan Reed	6 ft 4 in (1.93 m)	210 lb (95 kg)	RS Sr	Philadelphia, Pennsylvania
F/C	4	Ken'Darrius Hamilton	6 ft 9 in (2.06 m)	275 lb (125 kg)	Jr	Montgomery, Alabama
G	5	Tahjere McCall	6 ft 5 in (1.96 m)	195 lb (88 kg)	RS Sr	Philadelphia, Pennsylvania
G	10	Thomas Davis	6 ft 2 in (1.88 m)	175 lb (79 kg)	RS Fr	Nashville, Tennessee
F	13	Samson Oyediran	6 ft 7 in (2.01 m)	220 lb (100 kg)	RS So	London, England
G	14	Darreon Reddick	6 ft 4 in (1.93 m)	195 lb (88 kg)	Jr	Belleville, Illinois
F	15	Xavier Williams	6 ft 9 in (2.06 m)	220 lb (100 kg)	RS Jr	Fairfield, Alabama
F	21	Christian Mekowulu	6 ft 9 in (2.06 m)	240 lb (109 kg)	RS So	Lagos, Nigeria
G/F	22	Daniel Cummings	6 ft 5 in (1.96 m)	220 lb (100 kg)	Fr	Toronto, Ontario, Canada
G	23	A'Torey Everett	6 ft 4 in (1.93 m)	190 lb (86 kg)	So	Dallas, Texas
G/F	30	Khalill Spencer	6 ft 4 in (1.93 m)	230 lb (104 kg)	RS Fr	Memphis, Tennessee
F	33	Wayne Martin	6 ft 7 in (2.01 m)	237 lb (108 kg)	RS Sr	Brooklyn, New York
G	34	Jalen Duke	6 ft 5 in (1.96 m)	213 lb (97 kg)	RS Fr	Nashville, Tennessee

Head coach

- Dana Ford (Illinois State)

Assistant coach(es)

- Randy Peele (Virginia Wesleyan)
- Rodney Hamilton (Georgia State)
- Pierre Jordan (Georgia Tech)

Legend

- (C) Team captain
- (S) Suspended
- (I) Ineligible
- (W) Walk-on
- Injured
- Current redshirt

Roster

== Schedule and results ==
Date time, TV	Rank^{#}	Opponent^{#}	Result	Record	Site (attendance) city, state
Exhibition
11/03/2016*; 7:00 pm		Fisk	W 77–43		Gentry Complex (3,564); Nashville, TN
Regular season
11/11/2016*; 6:30 pm		vs. UC Davis; Cable Car Classic	W 78–64	1–0	Leavey Center (1,821); Santa Clara, CA
11/12/2016*; 10:30 pm		vs. Northern Arizona; Cable Car Classic	W 69–65	2–0	Leavey Center (1,734); Santa Clara, CA
11/13/2016*; 4:30 pm		at Santa Clara; Cable Car Classic	W 69–61	3–0	Leavey Center (1,102); Santa Clara, CA
11/19/2016*; 6:30 pm		at Middle Tennessee	W 74–63	4–0	Murphy Center (4,830); Murfreesboro, TN
11/23/2016*; 6:00 pm, ESPN3		at Canisius	W 72–58	5–0	Koessler Athletic Center (864); Buffalo, NY
11/26/2016*; 7:00 pm		Reinhardt	W 96–64	6–0	Gentry Complex (894); Nashville, TN
11/29/2016*; 7:00 pm, SECN+		at Vanderbilt	L 59–83	6–1	Memorial Gymnasium (8,445); Nashville, TN
12/03/2016*; 4:00 pm, ESPN3		at Lipscomb	W 72–71	7–1	Allen Arena (1,634); Nashville, TN
12/10/2016*; 3:00 pm, RSN		at NC State	L 55–67 ^{OT}	7–2	Reynolds Coliseum (5,500); Raleigh, NC
12/14/2016*; 7:30 pm		Alabama State	W 68–46	8–2	Gentry Complex (760); Nashville, TN
12/19/2016*; 6:00 pm, ESPN2		at No. 5 Duke	L 55–65	8–3	Cameron Indoor Stadium (9,314); Durham, NC
12/27/2016*; 7:00 pm		Covenant	W 81–50	9–3	Gentry Complex (522); Nashville, TN
12/31/2016; 11:00 am, CBSSN		at Murray State	L 83–92	9–4 (0–1)	CFSB Center (3,314); Murray, KY
01/02/2017*; 6:00 pm		Kennesaw State	L 73–76	9–5	Gentry Complex (483); Nashville, TN
01/05/2017; 7:30 pm		Southeast Missouri State	W 65–62	10–5 (1–1)	Gentry Complex (613); Nashville, TN
01/07/2017; 7:30 pm		UT Martin	W 76–65	11–5 (2–1)	Gentry Complex; Nashville, TN
01/12/2017; 6:00 pm, ASN		at Eastern Kentucky	W 63–49	12–5 (3–1)	McBrayer Arena (1,150); Richmond, KY
01/14/2017; 6:45 pm		at Morehead State	L 85–87	12–6 (3–2)	Ellis Johnson Arena (2,858); Morehead, KY
01/19/2017; 7:00 pm		Tennessee Tech	L 74–80	12–7 (3–3)	Gentry Complex (4,251); Nashville, TN
01/21/2017; 7:30 pm		Jacksonville State	L 79–86	12–8 (3–4)	Gentry Complex (5,106); Nashville, TN
01/25/2017; 7:00 pm		at SIU Edwardsville	W 76–56	13–8 (4–4)	Vadalabene Center (1,011); Edwardsville, IL
01/28/2017; 7:30 pm		Belmont	L 76–93	13–9 (4–5)	Gentry Complex (7,103); Nashville, TN
02/02/2017; 7:00 pm, CBSSN		Eastern Illinois	L 67–77 ^{OT}	13–10 (4–6)	Gentry Complex (3,931); Nashville, TN
02/04/2017; 6:00 pm		at Austin Peay	W 70–66	14–10 (5–6)	Dunn Center (2,995); Clarksville, TN
02/09/2017; 6:00 pm		at Tennessee Tech	W 72–59	15–10 (6–6)	Eblen Center (1,414); Cookeville, TN
02/11/2017; 4:30 pm		at Jacksonville State	L 57–63	15–11 (6–7)	Pete Mathews Coliseum (1,920); Jacksonville, AL
02/16/2017; 8:00 pm, ESPNU		Morehead State	W 64–52	16–11 (7–7)	Gentry Complex (3,765); Nashville, TN
02/18/2017; 7:30 pm		Eastern Kentucky	W 68–66	17–11 (8–7)	Gentry Complex (2,955); Nashville, TN
02/25/2017; 5:00 pm		at Belmont	L 63–68	17–12 (8–8)	Curb Event Center (4,458); Nashville, TN
Ohio Valley Conference tournament
03/01/2017; 6:30 pm	(8)	vs. (5) Southeast Missouri State; First Round	L 75–78 ^{OT}	17–13	Nashville Municipal Auditorium (1,043); Nashville, TN
*Non-conference game. ^{#}Rankings from AP Poll. (#) Tournament seedings in parentheses. All times are in Central Time.
