= Anthony Stewart (basketball coach) =

American basketball coach (1970–2020)

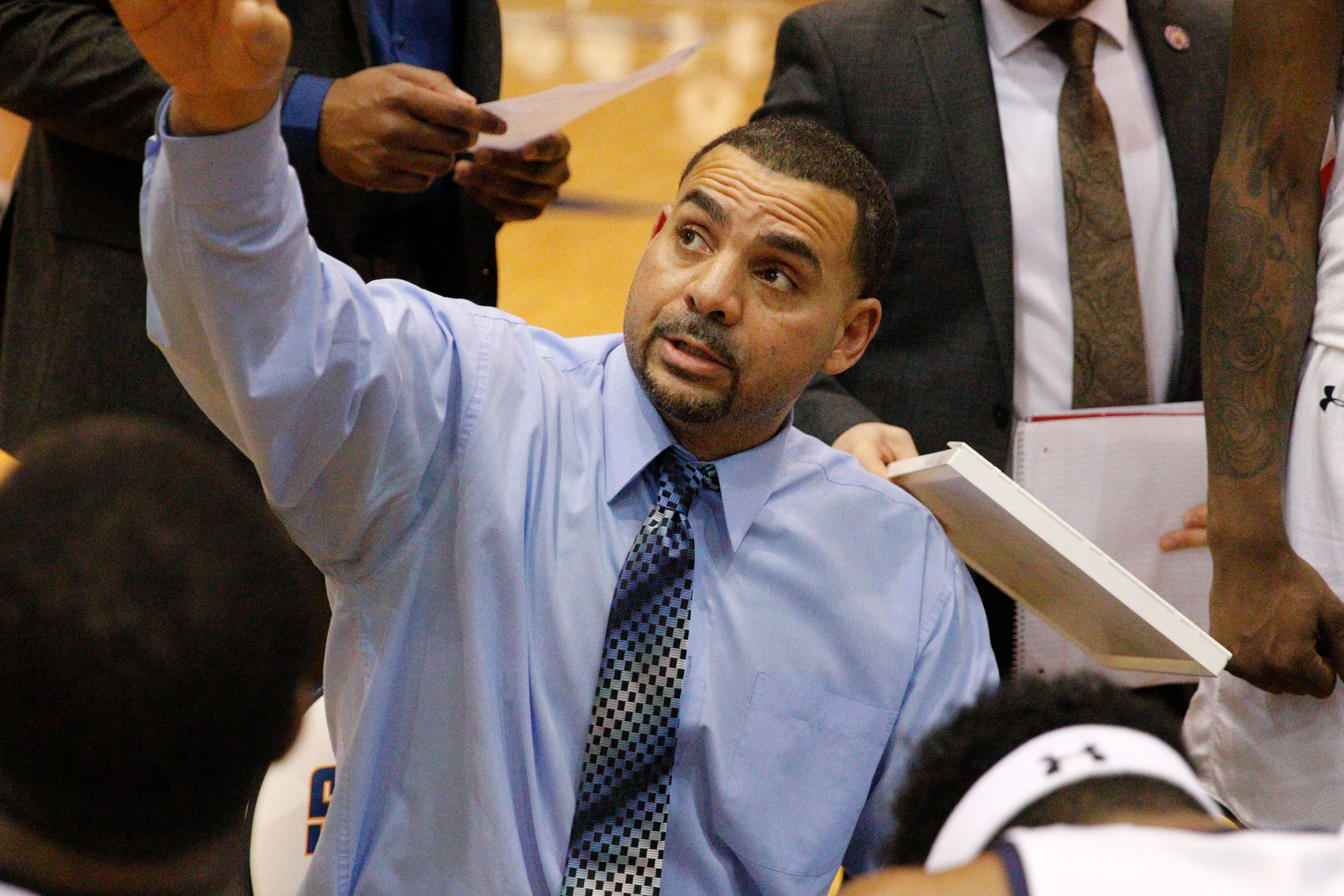

Biographical details
- Born: July 22, 1970; Akron, Ohio, U.S.
- Died: November 15, 2020 (aged 50); Martin, Tennessee, U.S.

Playing career
- 1989–1993: Mount Union

Coaching career (HC unless noted)
- 2001–2004: Columbus State CC (assistant)
- 2004–2006: Long Beach State (assistant)
- 2007–2011: Wyoming (assistant)
- 2011–2012: Southern Illinois (assistant)
- 2012–2014: Ohio (assistant)
- 2014–2016: UT Martin (assistant)
- 2016–2020: UT Martin

Head coaching record
- Overall: 51–73 (.411)
- Tournaments: 1–1 (CIT)

Accomplishments and honors

Championships
- OVC West Division (2017)

Anthony W. Stewart (July 22, 1970 – November 15, 2020) was an American college basketball coach. His last position was as head coach of the UT Martin Skyhawks men's basketball team. Since Stewart joined the Skyhawks program as the associate head coach under Heath Schroyer in 2014, the team won 94 games, the most in a six-year period since they became part of Division I. Stewart was responsible of the team's three straight 20-win campaigns from 2014 to 2017, a first for the UT team. Also in that span, the Skyhawks won five postseason games and was the only Ohio Valley Conference (OVC) school to win at least one postseason game in each of the last three seasons. Stewart had gone on to coach over 15 professional players during his coaching career.

== Playing career ==
Stewart was a two-sport athlete at Mount Union, where he played both basketball and baseball.

== Coaching career ==
Stewart began his coaching career at Columbus State Community College, before moving on to assistant coaching stops at Long Beach State, Wyoming, Southern Illinois and Ohio. In 2014, Stewart joined Heath Schroyer's staff at UT Martin, reunited with Schroyer when he served under him as an assistant at Wyoming. In 2016, Schroyer accepted an assistant coaching position at NC State, and Stewart was elevated to interim head coach.

On November 3, 2016, Stewart was given the job on a permanent basis. In his first season at the helm, the Skyhawks went 22–13, finished in first place in the West division of the OVC, and participated in the 2017 CIT. Following the 2017–18 season, his son Parker Stewart transferred from Pittsburgh to UT Martin.

== Death ==
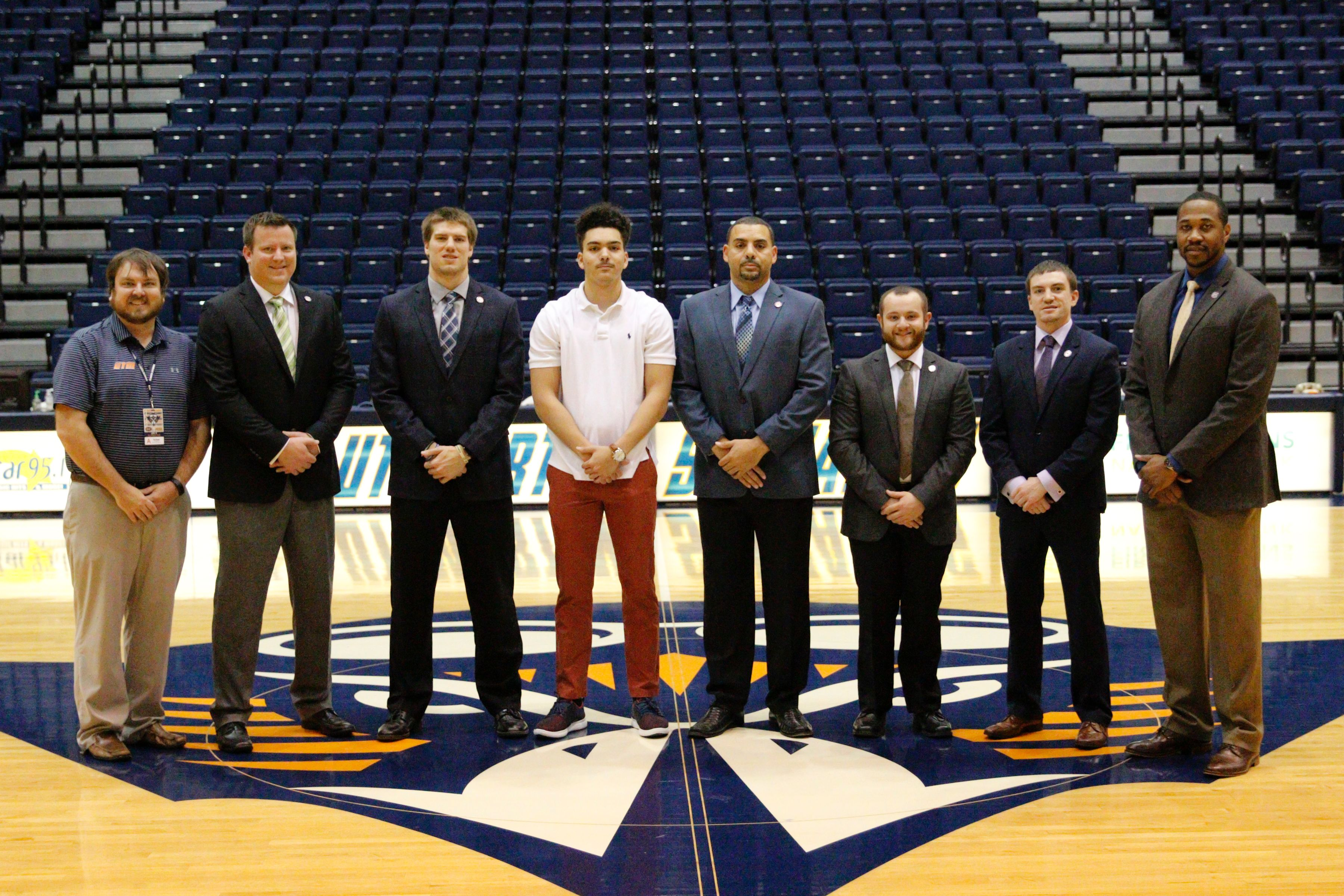
Coach Stewart and his staff during Stuttering Awareness Night in December 2018

On November 15, 2020, Stewart died suddenly at age 50. The cause is unknown. He was laid to rest at Greenlawn Cemetery in Akron, Ohio, and is survived by his wife Cheryl and his children Anthony, Parker and Skylar.

== Head coaching record ==
Record table
Season	Team	Overall	Conference	Standing	Postseason
UT Martin Skyhawks (Ohio Valley Conference) (2016–2020)
2016–17	UT Martin	22–13	10–6	1st (West)	CIT Second Round
2017–18	UT Martin	10–21	5–13	T–9th	
2018–19	UT Martin	12–19	6–12	T–7th	
2019–20	UT Martin	9–20	5–13	T–10th	
UT Martin:		51–73 (.411)	26–44 (.371)		
Total:		51–73 (.411)			
