= 2016–17 Eastern Kentucky Colonels men's basketball team =

American college basketball season

2016–17 Eastern Kentucky Colonels men's basketball
- Conference: Ohio Valley Conference
- East Division
- Record: 12–19 (5–11 OVC)
- Head coach: Dan McHale (2nd season)
- Assistant coaches: Reece Gaines; Ryan Whalen; Terrence Commodore
- Home arena: McBrayer Arena

2016–17 Ohio Valley Conference men's basketball standings
	Conf.				Overall
Team	W		L	PCT	W		L	PCT
East
Belmont	15	–	1	.938	23	–	7	.767
Morehead State	10	–	6	.625	14	–	16	.467
Jacksonville State †	9	–	7	.563	20	–	15	.571
Tennessee State	8	–	8	.500	17	–	13	.567
Tennessee Tech	8	–	8	.500	12	–	20	.375
Eastern Kentucky	5	–	11	.313	12	–	19	.387
West
UT Martin	10	–	6	.625	22	–	13	.629
Southeast Missouri St.	9	–	7	.563	15	–	18	.455
Murray State	8	–	8	.500	16	–	17	.485
Austin Peay	7	–	9	.438	11	–	19	.367
Eastern Illinois	6	–	10	.375	14	–	15	.483
SIU Edwardsville	1	–	15	.063	6	–	24	.200
† 2017 OVC tournament winner

The 2016–17 Eastern Kentucky Colonels men's basketball team represented Eastern Kentucky University during the 2016–17 NCAA Division I men's basketball season. The Colonels, led by second-year head coach Dan McHale, played their home games at McBrayer Arena within Alumni Coliseum and were members of the East Division of the Ohio Valley Conference. They finished the season 12–19, 5–11 in OVC play to finish in last place in the East Division. They failed to qualify for the Ohio Valley tournament.

== Previous season ==
The Colonels finished the 2015–16 season 15–16, 6–10 in OVC play to finish in fifth place in the East Division. They failed to qualify for the OVC tournament.

== Preseason ==
In a vote of Ohio Valley Conference head men's basketball coaches and sports information directors, Eastern Kentucky was picked to finish third in the East Division of the OVC.

== Roster ==
2016–17 Eastern Kentucky Colonels men's basketball team
Players
Coaches

Pos.	#	Name	Height	Weight	Year	Hometown
G	0	Dujuanta Weaver	5 ft 10 in (1.78 m)	175 lb (79 kg)	So	Louisville, Kentucky
F	1	Marlon Adams	6 ft 6 in (1.98 m)	215 lb (98 kg)	Fr	Middletown, New York
G	2	Asante Gist	5 ft 11 in (1.8 m)	185 lb (84 kg)	Fr	East Orange, New Jersey
F	3	DeAndre Dishman	6 ft 6 in (1.98 m)	215 lb (98 kg)	Fr	Lexington, Kentucky
G	4	Dillon Avare	6 ft 0 in (1.83 m)	160 lb (73 kg)	RS Jr	Lexington, Kentucky
G	5	Isaac McGlone	6 ft 0 in (1.83 m)	175 lb (79 kg)	Sr	Lancaster, Ohio
F	10	Nick Mayo	6 ft 9 in (2.06 m)	235 lb (107 kg)	So	Oakland, Maine
G	11	Jaylen Babb-Harrison	6 ft 4 in (1.93 m)	190 lb (86 kg)	RS Sr	Ajax, Ontario, Canada
F	12	Zach Charles	6 ft 7 in (2.01 m)	210 lb (95 kg)	Jr	Mesquite, Texas
F	13	Jackson Davis (redshirt)	6 ft 8 in (2.03 m)	215 lb (98 kg)	Jr	Lexington, Kentucky
G	14	Daniel Parke	6 ft 1 in (1.85 m)	175 lb (79 kg)	RS Jr	Richmond, Kentucky
G	15	Kirkland Humphrey	6 ft 0 in (1.83 m)	170 lb (77 kg)	So	Richmond, Kentucky
F	21	Lachlan Anderson	6 ft 8 in (2.03 m)	190 lb (86 kg)	Fr	Sydney, Australia
G	22	Trevor Hill	6 ft 1 in (1.85 m)	175 lb (79 kg)	Fr	Corbin, Kentucky
G	25	Oliver Bishop	6 ft 0 in (1.83 m)	170 lb (77 kg)	RS So	Chicago, Illinois
G	31	Parker Chitty	6 ft 2 in (1.88 m)	190 lb (86 kg)	Fr	Columbus, Indiana

Head coach

- Dan McHale (Kentucky)

Assistant coach(es)

- Reece Gaines (Louisville)
- Ryan Whalen (Saint Joseph's)
- Terrence Commodore (Eastern Kentucky)

Legend

- (C) Team captain
- (S) Suspended
- (I) Ineligible
- (W) Walk-on
- Injured
- Current redshirt

Roster

== Schedule and results ==
Date time, TV	Opponent	Result	Record	Site (attendance) city, state
Exhibition
11/07/2016*; 2:00 pm	Georgetown College	W 83–71		McBrayer Arena (2,300); Richmond, KY
Non-conference regular season
11/11/2016*; 8:00 pm	IUPUI	W 97–87	1–0	McBrayer Arena (2,300); Richmond, KY
11/14/2016*; 7:00 pm	UNC Wilmington	L 69–78 ^{OT}	1–1	McBrayer Arena (1,850); Richmond, KY
11/17/2016*; 9:00 pm, SECN	at Auburn; Cancún Challenge	L 64–85	1–2	Auburn Arena (6,987); Auburn, AL
11/19/2016*; 2:00 pm, FSSW	at Texas Tech; Cancún Challenge	L 71–90	1–3	United Supermarkets Arena (5,898); Lubbock, TX
11/22/2016*; 3:00 pm	vs. Idaho State; Cancún Challenge Mayan division semifinals	W 91–82	2–3	Hard Rock Hotel Riviera Maya (1,610); Cancún, Mexico
11/22/2016*; 3:00 pm	vs. Georgia State; Cancún Challenge	L 65–82	2–4	Hard Rock Hotel Riviera Maya; Cancún, Mexico
11/26/2016*; 7:00 pm	Berea	W 92–64	3–4	McBrayer Arena (1,300); Richmond, KY
11/30/2016*; 8:00 pm	WKU	W 78–59	4–4	McBrayer Arena (5,400); Richmond, KY
12/03/2016*; 7:00 pm	Marshall	W 89–80	5–4	McBrayer Arena (2,100); Richmond, KY
12/07/2016*; 7:00 pm	at Jacksonville	W 80–76	6–4	Swisher Gymnasium (1,152); Jacksonville, FL
12/10/2016*; 2:00 pm	at Ball State	L 86–91 ^{OT}	6–5	Worthen Arena (2,623); Muncie, IN
12/17/2016*; 12:00 pm, ACCN Extra	at No. 11 Louisville; Billy Minardi Classic	L 56–87	6–6	KFC Yum! Center (20,889); Louisville, KY
12/19/2016*; 7:00 pm	at Norfolk State	L 80–87 ^{OT}	6–7	Joseph G. Echols Memorial Hall (621); Norfolk, VA
12/22/2016*; 7:00 pm	at Manhattan	L 54–81	6–8	Draddy Gymnasium (925); Riverdale, NY
12/28/2016*; 7:00 pm	UVA–Wise	W 70–51	7–8	McBrayer Arena (1,050); Richmond, KY
Ohio Valley Conference regular season
12/31/2016; 3:30 pm	at Southeast Missouri State	L 48–81	7–9 (0–1)	Show Me Center (720); Cape Girardeau, MO
01/05/2017; 8:00 pm	SIU Edwardsville	W 78–61	8–9 (1–1)	McBrayer Arena (1,200); Richmond, KY
01/07/2017; 2:00 pm	Eastern Illinois	L 60–74	8–10 (1–2)	McBrayer Arena (1,300); Richmond, KY
01/12/2017; 7:00 pm, ASN	Tennessee State	L 49–63	8–11 (1–3)	McBrayer Arena (1,150); Richmond, KY
01/14/2017; 7:00 pm	Belmont	L 59–72	8–12 (1–4)	McBrayer Arena (2,300); Richmond, KY
01/19/2017; 8:00 pm	at Murray State	L 79–86	8–13 (1–5)	CFSB Center (3,950); Murray, KY
01/21/2017; 7:45 pm	at Morehead State	L 54–80	8–14 (1–6)	Ellis Johnson Arena (5,789); Morehead, KY
01/26/2017; 8:00 pm	at Jacksonville State	W 57–52	9–14 (2–6)	Pete Mathews Coliseum (1,552); Jacksonville, AL
01/28/2017; 8:30 pm	at Tennessee Tech	W 79–66	10–14 (3–6)	Eblen Center (2,878); Cookeville, TN
02/01/2017; 8:00 pm	Austin Peay	L 81–83 ^{OT}	10–15 (3–7)	McBrayer Arena (2,450); Richmond, KY
02/04/2017; 7:00 pm	at UT Martin	L 68–85	10–16 (3–8)	Skyhawk Arena (2,103); Martin, TN
02/11/2017; 7:00 pm	Morehead State	L 62–67	10–17 (3–9)	McBrayer Arena (3,800); Richmond, KY
02/16/2017; 8:00 pm	at Belmont	L 72–76	10–18 (3–10)	Curb Event Center (2,705); Nashville, TN
02/18/2017; 8:30 pm	at Tennessee State	L 66–68	10–19 (3–11)	Gentry Complex (2,955); Nashville, TN
02/23/2017; 7:00 pm	Jacksonville State	W 68–65	11–19 (4–11)	McBrayer Arena (1,600); Richmond, KY
02/25/2017; 2:00 pm, ASN	Tennessee Tech	W 75–71	12–19 (5–11)	McBrayer Arena (2,300); Richmond, KY
*Non-conference game. ^{#}Rankings from AP Poll. (#) Tournament seedings in parentheses. All times are in Eastern Time.
