= 2016–17 Murray State Racers men's basketball team =

American college basketball season

2016–17 Murray State Racers men's basketball
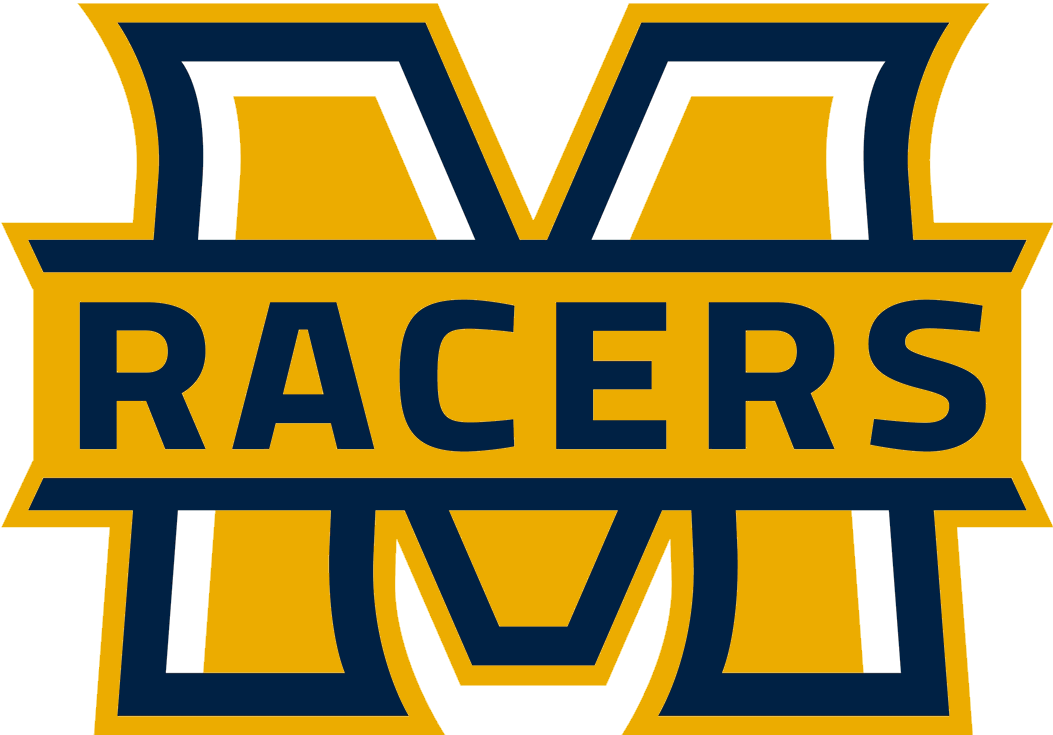
- Conference: Ohio Valley Conference
- West Division
- Record: 16–17 (8–8 OVC)
- Head coach: Matt McMahon (2n season)
- Assistant coaches: James Kane; Tim Kaine; Shane Nichols
- Home arena: CFSB Center

2016–17 Ohio Valley Conference men's basketball standings
	Conf.				Overall
Team	W		L	PCT	W		L	PCT
East
Belmont	15	–	1	.938	23	–	7	.767
Morehead State	10	–	6	.625	14	–	16	.467
Jacksonville State †	9	–	7	.563	20	–	15	.571
Tennessee State	8	–	8	.500	17	–	13	.567
Tennessee Tech	8	–	8	.500	12	–	20	.375
Eastern Kentucky	5	–	11	.313	12	–	19	.387
West
UT Martin	10	–	6	.625	22	–	13	.629
Southeast Missouri St.	9	–	7	.563	15	–	18	.455
Murray State	8	–	8	.500	16	–	17	.485
Austin Peay	7	–	9	.438	11	–	19	.367
Eastern Illinois	6	–	10	.375	14	–	15	.483
SIU Edwardsville	1	–	15	.063	6	–	24	.200
† 2017 OVC tournament winner

The 2016–17 Murray State Racers men's basketball team represented Murray State University during the 2016–17 NCAA Division I men's basketball season. The Racers, led by second-year head coach Matt McMahon, played their home games at the CFSB Center in Murray, Kentucky as members of the West Division of the Ohio Valley Conference. They finished the season 16–17, 8–8 in OVC play to finish in third place in the West Division. As the No. 7 seed in the OVC tournament, they defeated Tennessee Tech and Morehead State before losing to UT Martin in the semifinals.

== Previous season ==
The Racers finished the 2015–16 season 17–14, 10–6 in OVC play to finish in a tie for the West Division title. They defeated Eastern Illinois in the first round of the OVC tournament to advance to the quarterfinals where they lost to Morehead State.

== Preseason ==
In a vote of Ohio Valley Conference head men's basketball coaches and sports information directors, Murray State was picked to win the West Division of the OVC. Bryce Jones was selected to the All-OVC Preseason Team.

== Roster ==
2016–17 Murray State Racers men's basketball team
Players
Coaches

Pos.	#	Name	Height	Weight	Year	Previous school	Hometown
F	0	Terrell Miller Jr.	6 ft 8 in (2.03 m)	250 lb (113 kg)	Jr	Arlington Country Day; SW Miss CC	Jacksonville, FL
G	1	Jerami Grace	6 ft 3 in (1.91 m)	185 lb (84 kg)	So	Ducanville; McLennan CC	Dallas, TX
F	2	Jonathan Stark	6 ft 0 in (1.83 m)	175 lb (79 kg)	Jr	Bob Jones; Tulane	Munford, TN
F	4	Brion Sanchious	6 ft 8 in (2.03 m)	245 lb (111 kg)	So	Northeast	Pompano Beach, FL
G	10	Janoris Brown	6 ft 3 in (1.91 m)	190 lb (86 kg)	Jr	Raleigh	Raleigh, NC
G	11	Damarcus Croaker	6 ft 4 in (1.93 m)	190 lb (86 kg)	Sr	Jones; Texas	Orlando, FL
F	12	Gee McGhee	6 ft 5 in (1.96 m)	225 lb (102 kg)	Sr	Redemptorist; Chattanooga	Baton Rouge, LA
G	22	Gilbert Thomas, Jr.	6 ft 7 in (2.01 m)	225 lb (102 kg)	Fr	C.E. King	Houston, TN
G	23	Jachai Taylor	6 ft 7 in (2.01 m)	190 lb (86 kg)	Fr	Waukegan	Waukegan, IL
G	25	Byron Hawkins	6 ft 1 in (1.85 m)	180 lb (82 kg)	Jr	Clinton Christian; Towson	Fort Washington, MD
G	32	Bryce Jones	6 ft 0 in (1.83 m)	175 lb (79 kg)	Sr	Boys and Girls; Jones County CC	Brooklyn, NY
F	40	Jalen Dupree	6 ft 8 in (2.03 m)	235 lb (107 kg)	Fr	Cordova	Cordova, TN

Head coach

- Matt McMahon (Appalachian State)

Assistant coach(es)

- James Kane (Florida)
- Tim Kaine (Winthrop)
- Shane Nichols (Wofford)

Legend

- (C) Team captain
- (S) Suspended
- (I) Ineligible
- (W) Walk-on
- Injured
- Current redshirt

Roster
Last update: 8-7-16

== Schedule and results ==
Date time, TV	Rank^{#}	Opponent^{#}	Result	Record	Site (attendance) city, state
Exhibition
11/03/2016*; 7:00 pm		Berry	W 116–71		CFSB Center (2,327); Murray, KY
Non-conference regular season
11/11/2016*; 7:00 pm		Illinois State	W 73–70	1–0	CFSB Center (4,321); Murray, KY
11/15/2016*; 6:30 pm		at Middle Tennessee	L 81–87	1–1	Murphy Center (4,507); Murfreesboro, TN
11/19/2016*; 6:00 pm		vs. Green Bay; Bill Frack Tournament	W 93–77	2–1	Stroh Center (1,676); Bowling Green, OH
11/20/2016*; 3:00 pm		vs. UMKC; Bill Frack Tournament	L 74–85	2–2	Stroh Center (1,514); Bowling Green, OH
11/21/2016*; 6:00 pm		at Bowling Green; Bill Frack Tournament	L 77–78	2–3	Stroh Center (1,545); Bowling Green, OH
11/26/2016*; 7:00 pm		Alabama A&M	W 91–54	3–3	CFSB Center (2,401); Murray, KY
11/29/2016*; 7:00 pm		at Southern Illinois	L 85–89 ^{OT}	3–4	SIU Arena (4,334); Carbondale, IL
12/03/2016*; 7:00 pm		Detroit	W 86–76	4–4	CFSB Center (3,191); Murray, KY
12/10/2016*; 3:00 pm		at Evansville	L 46–78	4–5	Ford Center (5,016); Evansville, IN
12/12/2016*; 7:00 pm		Bethel (TN)	W 103–65	5–5	CFSB Center (2,050); Murray, KY
12/15/2016*; 7:00 pm, ESPN3		at Ole Miss	L 73–78	5–6	The Pavilion at Ole Miss (6,650); Oxford, MS
12/17/2016*; 4:00 pm		at South Dakota State	L 84–88 ^{OT}	5–7	Frost Arena (1,081); Brookings, SD
12/22/2016*; 7:00 pm		Wright State	L 62–77	5–8	CFSB Center (2,413); Murray, KY
12/29/2016*; 7:00 pm		Brescia	W 99–83	6–8	CFSB Center (2,078); Murray, KY
Ohio Valley Conference regular season
12/31/2016; 11:00 am, CBSSN		Tennessee State	W 92–83	7–8 (1–0)	CFSB Center (3,314); Murray, KY
01/05/2017; 7:30 pm		at Jacksonville State	W 76–63	8–8 (2–0)	Pete Mathews Coliseum (2,206); Jacksonville, AL
01/07/2017; 7:30 pm		at Tennessee Tech	L 67–71	8–9 (2–1)	Eblen Center (2,017); Cookeville, TN
01/12/2017; 7:00 pm		at Eastern Illinois	W 83–72	9–9 (3–1)	Lantz Arena (1,531); Charleston, IL
01/14/2017; 7:00 pm		at SIU Edwardsville	W 67–59	10–9 (4–1)	Vadalabene Center (1,372); Edwardsville, IL
01/19/2017; 7:00 pm		Eastern Kentucky	W 86–79	11–9 (5–1)	CFSB Center (3,950); Murray, KY
01/21/2017; 6:30 pm		at Austin Peay	L 81–84 ^{OT}	11–10 (5–2)	Dunn Center (4,263); Clarksville, TN
01/26/2017; 7:00 pm		Southeast Missouri State	L 74–75	11–11 (5–3)	CFSB Center (3,080); Murray, KY
01/28/2017; 7:00 pm		UT Martin	W 94–86	12–11 (6–3)	CFSB Center (3,909); Murray, KY
02/02/2017; 8:00 pm, ESPNU		Belmont	L 69–81	12–12 (6–4)	CFSB Center (5,041); Murray, KY
02/08/2017; 6:00 pm		at Morehead State	L 100–101 ^{OT}	12–13 (6–5)	Ellis Johnson Arena (4,109); Morehead, KY
02/11/2017; 7:00 pm		Austin Peay	W 102–58	13–13 (7–5)	CFSB Center (4,016); Murray, KY
02/16/2017; 6:00 pm, ESPNU		SIU Edwardsville	W 84–73	14–13 (8–5)	CFSB Center (2,974); Murray, KY
02/18/2017; 7:00 pm		Eastern Illinois	L 65–82	14–14 (8–6)	CFSB Center (4,402); Murray, KY
02/23/2017; 6:30 pm		at Southeast Missouri State	L 69–82	14–15 (8–7)	Show Me Center (5,225); Cape Girardeau, MO
02/25/2017; 6:00 pm		at UT Martin	L 76–83	14–16 (8–8)	Skyhawk Arena (3,314); Martin, TN
Ohio Valley Conference tournament
03/01/2017; 8:30 pm	(7)	vs. (6) Tennessee Tech; First Round	W 85–84 ^{2OT}	15–16	Nashville Municipal Auditorium (1,043); Nashville, TN
03/02/2017; 8:30 pm	(7)	vs. (3) Morehead State; Quarterfinals	W 75–69	16–16	Nashville Municipal Auditorium (1,001); Nashville, TN
03/03/2017; 9:00 pm, ESPNU	(7)	vs. (2) UT Martin; Semifinals	L 67–73	16–17	Nashville Municipal Auditorium (2,355); Nashville, TN
*Non-conference game. (#) Tournament seedings in parentheses. All times are in Central Time Source.
