= 2016–17 Tennessee Tech Golden Eagles men's basketball team =

American college basketball season

2016–17 Tennessee Tech Golden Eagles men's basketball
- Conference: Ohio Valley Conference
- East Division
- Record: 12–20 (8–8 OVC)
- Head coach: Steve Payne (6th season)
- Assistant coaches: Rick Cabrera; Frank Davis; Jason Taylor
- Home arena: Eblen Center

2016–17 Ohio Valley Conference men's basketball standings
	Conf.				Overall
Team	W		L	PCT	W		L	PCT
East
Belmont	15	–	1	.938	23	–	7	.767
Morehead State	10	–	6	.625	14	–	16	.467
Jacksonville State †	9	–	7	.563	20	–	15	.571
Tennessee State	8	–	8	.500	17	–	13	.567
Tennessee Tech	8	–	8	.500	12	–	20	.375
Eastern Kentucky	5	–	11	.313	12	–	19	.387
West
UT Martin	10	–	6	.625	22	–	13	.629
Southeast Missouri St.	9	–	7	.563	15	–	18	.455
Murray State	8	–	8	.500	16	–	17	.485
Austin Peay	7	–	9	.438	11	–	19	.367
Eastern Illinois	6	–	10	.375	14	–	15	.483
SIU Edwardsville	1	–	15	.063	6	–	24	.200
† 2017 OVC tournament winner

The 2016–17 Tennessee Tech Golden Eagles men's basketball team represented Tennessee Technological University during the 2016–17 NCAA Division I men's basketball season. The Golden Eagles, led by sixth-year head coach Steve Payne, played their home games at the Eblen Center in Cookeville, Tennessee and were members of the East Division of the Ohio Valley Conference. They finished the season 12–20, 8–8 in OVC play to finish in a tie for fourth place in the East Division. As the No. 6 seed in the OVC tournament, they lost in the first round to Murray State.

== Previous season ==
The Eagles finished the 2015–16 season 19–12, 11–5 in OVC play to finish in a three-way tie for second place in the East Division. They lost in the first round of the OVC tournament to Austin Peay. They were invited to the inaugural Vegas 16, which only had 8 teams, where they lost in the quarterfinals to Old Dominion.

== Preseason ==
In a vote of Ohio Valley Conference head men's basketball coaches and sports information directors, Tennessee Tech was picked to finish in fourth place in the East Division of the OVC. Aleksa Jugovic was selected to the All-OVC Preseason Team.

== Roster ==
2016–17 Tennessee Tech Golden Eagles men's basketball team
Players
Coaches

Pos.	#	Name	Height	Weight	Year	Hometown
G	1	Markell Henderson	6 ft 5 in (1.96 m)	195 lb (88 kg)	Jr	Boswell, Oklahoma
G	2	Hakeem Rogers	6 ft 2 in (1.88 m)	180 lb (82 kg)	Sr	Elizabeth, New Jersey
G	3	Miles Thomas	6 ft 5 in (1.96 m)	175 lb (79 kg)	Fr	Chattanooga, Tennessee
G	4	Aleksa Jugovic	6 ft 3 in (1.91 m)	185 lb (84 kg)	Jr	Leskovac, Serbia
G	10	Kajon Mack	6 ft 3 in (1.91 m)	190 lb (86 kg)	Sr	Los Angeles, California
C	11	Micaiah Henry	6 ft 9 in (2.06 m)	235 lb (107 kg)	RS Fr	Decatur, Georgia
G	12	Stephaun Adams	6 ft 2 in (1.88 m)	175 lb (79 kg)	So	St. Thomas, Virgin Islands
F	15	Curtis Phillips Jr.	6 ft 5 in (1.96 m)	185 lb (84 kg)	Jr	Memphis, Tennessee
G	20	Savonte Frazier	6 ft 0 in (1.83 m)	180 lb (82 kg)	So	Lake Wales, Florida
G	21	Conner Hall	6 ft 3 in (1.91 m)	195 lb (88 kg)	So	Gainesboro, Tennessee
F	22	Courtney Alexander II	6 ft 7 in (2.01 m)	205 lb (93 kg)	So	Mableton, Georgia
F	24	Ja'Cardo Hawkins	6 ft 8 in (2.03 m)	230 lb (104 kg)	Jr	Gonzales, Louisiana
F	25	Mason Ramsey	6 ft 6 in (1.98 m)	230 lb (104 kg)	Jr	Livingston, Tennessee
F	30	Colton Blevins	6 ft 8 in (2.03 m)	230 lb (104 kg)	Fr	Jamestown, Tennessee

Head coach

- Steve Payne (Union Commonwealth)

Assistant coach(es)

- Rick Cabrera (Tennessee Tech)
- Frank Davis (Tennessee Tech)
- Jason Taylor (Jacksonville State)

Legend

- (C) Team captain
- (S) Suspended
- (I) Ineligible
- (W) Walk-on
- Injured
- Current redshirt

Roster

== Schedule and results ==
Date time, TV	Rank^{#}	Opponent^{#}	Result	Record	Site (attendance) city, state
Non-conference regular season
11/11/2016*; 7:00 pm, ACC Extra		at Georgia Tech	L 55–70	0–1	Hank McCamish Pavilion (6,018); Atlanta, GA
11/14/2016*; 7:30 pm		Central Michigan	L 74–86	0–2	Eblen Center (1,546); Cookeville, TN
11/17/2016*; 7:30 pm		Alabama A&M	W 95-61	1–2	Eblen Center (1,396); Cookeville, TN
11/20/2016*; 2:00 pm		Sam Houston State	L 71–78	1–3	Eblen Center (768); Cookeville, TN
11/22/2016*; 7:00 pm		at Southern	L 68–80	1–4	F. G. Clark Center (601); Baton Rouge, LA
11/25/2016*; 6:00 pm		at Ohio	L 57–68	1–5	Convocation Center (6,388); Athens, OH
11/28/2016*; 7:00 pm		Hiwassee	W 80–47	2–5	Eblen Center (708); Cookeville, TN
12/01/2016*; 7:00 pm, ESPN3		at Lipscomb	L 85–104	2–6	Allen Arena (982); Nashville, TN
12/03/2016*; 6:00 pm		at Alabama A&M	W 79–74	3–6	Elmore Gymnasium (1,735); Huntsville, AL
12/04/2016*; 4:00 pm		Crowley's Ridge	W 98–51	4–6	Eblen Center (1,091); Cookeville, TN
12/10/2016*; 1:00 pm, BTN		at Michigan State	L 63–71	4–7	Breslin Center (14,797); East Lansing, MI
12/13/2016*; 6:00 pm, SECN		at Tennessee	L 68–74	4–8	Thompson–Boling Arena (11,524); Knoxville, TN
12/17/2016*; 6:00 pm		Lipscomb	L 79–81	4–9	Eblen Center (961); Cookeville, TN
12/19/2016*; 6:00 pm		Furman	L 62–68	4–10	Eblen Center (799); Cookeville, TN
12/22/2016*; 2:30 pm		at Miami (OH)	L 58–66	4–11	Millett Hall (1,108); Oxford, OH
Ohio Valley Conference regular season
12/31/2016; 2:30 pm		at SIU Edwardsville	W 72–66	5–11 (1–0)	Vadalabene Center (1,781); Edwardsville, IL
01/05/2017; 7:30 pm		Austin Peay	W 76–67	6–11 (2–0)	Eblen Center (1,493); Cookeville, TN
01/07/2017; 7:30 pm		Murray State	W 71–67	6–12 (3–0)	Eblen Center (2,017); Cookeville, TN
01/10/2017; 6:30 pm		at Southeast Missouri State	L 78–83	7–12 (3–1)	Show Me Center (923); Cape Girardeau, MO
01/14/2017; 7:30 pm		Jacksonville State	L 59–74	7–12 (3–2)	Eblen Center (2,882); Cookeville, TN
01/19/2017; 7:00 pm		at Tennessee State	W 80–74	8–12 (4–2)	Gentry Complex (4,251); Nashville, TN
01/21/2017; 11:00 am, ASN		at Belmont	L 70–82	8–13 (4–3)	Curb Event Center (2,061); Nashville, TN
01/26/2017; 6:00 pm		Morehead State	W 76–73	9–13 (5–3)	Eblen Center (1,644); Cookeville, TN
01/28/2017; 7:30 pm		Eastern Kentucky	L 66–79	9–14 (5–4)	Eblen Center (2,878); Cookeville, TN
02/01/2017; 7:30 pm		UT Martin	L 46–75	9–15 (5–5)	Eblen Center (1,555); Cookeville, TN
02/04/2017; 3:15 pm		at Eastern Illinois	W 87–68	10–15 (6–5)	Lantz Arena (1,077); Charleston, IL
02/09/2017; 6:00 pm		Tennessee State	L 59–72	10–17 (6–6)	Eblen Center (1,414); Cookeville, TN
02/11/2017; 7:30 pm		Belmont	W 83–70	11–17 (7–6)	Eblen Center (3,879); Cookeville, TN
02/18/2017; 7:00 pm		at Jacksonville State	W 79–78 ^{OT}	12–17 (8–6)	Pete Mathews Coliseum (1,822); Jacksonville, AL
02/23/2017; 8:00 pm, CBSSN		at Morehead State	L 68–73	12–18 (8–7)	Ellis Johnson Arena (3,383); Morehead, KY
02/25/2017; 1:00 pm, ASN		at Eastern Kentucky	L 71–75	12–19 (8–8)	McBrayer Arena (2,300); Richmond, KY
Ohio Valley Conference tournament
03/01/2017; 8:30 pm	(6)	vs. (7) Murray State; First Round	L 84–85 ^{2OT}	12–20	Nashville Municipal Auditorium (1,043); Nashville, TN
*Non-conference game. (#) Tournament seedings in parentheses. All times are in Central Time.
