= 2016–17 Jacksonville State Gamecocks men's basketball team =

American college basketball season

2016–17 Jacksonville State Gamecocks men's basketball

Ohio Valley tournament champions

NCAA tournament, First Round
- Conference: Ohio Valley Conference
- East Division
- Record: 20–15 (9–7 OVC)
- Head coach: Ray Harper (1st season)
- Assistant coaches: Chase Richardson; Jake Morton; Tommy Wade
- Home arena: Pete Mathews Coliseum

2016–17 Ohio Valley Conference men's basketball standings
	Conf.				Overall
Team	W		L	PCT	W		L	PCT
East
Belmont	15	–	1	.938	23	–	7	.767
Morehead State	10	–	6	.625	14	–	16	.467
Jacksonville State †	9	–	7	.563	20	–	15	.571
Tennessee State	8	–	8	.500	17	–	13	.567
Tennessee Tech	8	–	8	.500	12	–	20	.375
Eastern Kentucky	5	–	11	.313	12	–	19	.387
West
UT Martin	10	–	6	.625	22	–	13	.629
Southeast Missouri St.	9	–	7	.563	15	–	18	.455
Murray State	8	–	8	.500	16	–	17	.485
Austin Peay	7	–	9	.438	11	–	19	.367
Eastern Illinois	6	–	10	.375	14	–	15	.483
SIU Edwardsville	1	–	15	.063	6	–	24	.200
† 2017 OVC tournament winner

The 2016–17 Jacksonville State Gamecocks men's basketball team represented Jacksonville State University during the 2016–17 NCAA Division I men's basketball season. The Gamecocks, led by first-year head coach Ray Harper, played their home games at the Pete Mathews Coliseum in Jacksonville, Alabama as members of the East Division of the Ohio Valley Conference. They finished the season 20–15, 9–7 in OVC play to finish in third place in the East Division. As the No. 4 seed in the OVC tournament, they defeated Southeast Missouri State, top-seeded Belmont, and UT Martin to win the tournament title. As a result, they received the conference's automatic bid to the NCAA tournament, its first ever appearance, where it lost in the first round to Louisville.

== Previous season ==
The Gamecocks finished the 2015–16 season 8–23, 4–12 in OVC play to finish in last place in the East Division. As a result, they failed to qualify for the OVC tournament.

Following the season, Jacksonville State and head coach James Green mutually agreed to part ways. On April 6, 2016, the school hired Ray Harper as head coach.

== Preseason ==
In a vote of Ohio Valley Conference head men’s basketball coaches and sports information directors, Jacksonville State was picked to finish last in the East Division of the OVC.

== Roster ==
2016–17 Jacksonville State Gamecocks men's basketball team
Players
Coaches

Pos.	#	Name	Height	Weight	Year	Hometown
F	0	Immanuel Griggs	6 ft 8 in (2.03 m)	200 lb (91 kg)	Jr	Newnan, Georgia
G	1	Greg Tucker	6 ft 2 in (1.88 m)	195 lb (88 kg)	Sr	Charleston, Missouri
G/F	2	Mohamed Abuarisha	6 ft 7 in (2.01 m)	200 lb (91 kg)	Fr	Hadera, Israel
G/F	3	Derrick Green	6 ft 3 in (1.91 m)	195 lb (88 kg)	Fr	Baltimore, Maryland
G	4	Tyrik Edwards	5 ft 10 in (1.78 m)	165 lb (75 kg)	Fr	Hopkinsville, Kentucky
G	5	Des Curry	6 ft 0 in (1.83 m)	175 lb (79 kg)	RS Jr	Jacksonville, Alabama
G	10	Deshawn Jones	6 ft 3 in (1.91 m)	195 lb (88 kg)	Jr	Gulfport, Mississippi
F	11	Jacara Cross	6 ft 8 in (2.03 m)	250 lb (113 kg)	Fr	Lithonia, Georgia
F/C	12	Norbertas Giga	7 ft 0 in (2.13 m)	245 lb (111 kg)	Jr	Kaunas, Lithuania
G	15	Erik Durham	6 ft 4 in (1.93 m)	190 lb (86 kg)	Sr	Springfield, Missouri
G	21	Malcolm Drumwright	6 ft 2 in (1.88 m)	185 lb (84 kg)	Jr	Rancho Cucamonga, California
G	25	Keeto Browne	5 ft 11 in (1.8 m)	195 lb (88 kg)	So	Sydney, Australia
F	31	Christian Cunningham	6 ft 7 in (2.01 m)	215 lb (98 kg)	So	Albuquerque, New Mexico
G/F	33	Andre Statam	6 ft 6 in (1.98 m)	240 lb (109 kg)	So	Cape Girardeau, Missouri
G	34	Ashton Spears	6 ft 2 in (1.88 m)	175 lb (79 kg)	Fr	Independence, Louisiana

Head coach

- Ray Harper (Kentucky Wesleyan)

Assistant coach(es)

- Chase Richardson (Western Kentucky)
- Jake Morton (Miami (FL))
- Tommy Wade (Southeast Missouri State)

Legend

- (C) Team captain
- (S) Suspended
- (I) Ineligible
- (W) Walk-on
- Injured
- Current redshirt

Roster

== Schedule and results ==
Date time, TV	Rank^{#}	Opponent^{#}	Result	Record	Site (attendance) city, state
Exhibition
10/28/2016*; 7:00 pm		Shorter	W 105–82		Pete Mathews Coliseum (1,777); Jacksonville, AL
11/03/2016*; 7:00 pm		Spring Hill	W 72–62		Pete Mathews Coliseum (1,434); Jacksonville, AL
Regular season
11/11/2016*; 7:00 pm, ESPN3		at Tulsa	W 84–73	1–0	Reynolds Center (3,604); Tulsa, OK
11/13/2016*; 1:05 pm		at Missouri State	L 65–91	1–1	JQH Arena (3,330); Springfield, MO
11/16/2016*; 8:00 pm		at WKU; Global Sports Classic	L 67–74	1–2	E. A. Diddle Arena (4,226); Bowling Green, KY
11/18/2016*; 6:00 pm, FSSW		at TCU; Global Sports Classic	L 60–79	1–3	Schollmaier Arena (5,839); Fort Worth, TX
11/22/2016*; 7:30 pm		Dalton State	W 81–50	2–3	Pete Mathews Coliseum (871); Jacksonville, AL
11/25/2016*; 1:00 pm		vs. Cal State Fullerton; Global Sports Classic	W 61–38	3–3	Thomas & Mack Center; Paradise, NV
11/26/2016*; 3:30 pm		vs. Northern Arizona; Global Sports Classic	W 76–63	4–3	Thomas & Mack Center (244); Paradise, NV
11/29/2016*; 7:00 pm		at Alabama State	W 72–69	5–3	Dunn–Oliver Acadome (1,259); Montgomery, AL
12/04/2016*; 7:00 pm		at Samford	L 77–81	5–4	Pete Hanna Center (1,563); Birmingham, AL
12/10/2016*; 7:00 pm		at Louisiana–Monroe	L 83–88 ^{OT}	5–5	Fant–Ewing Coliseum (1,035); Monroe, LA
12/12/2016*; 8:00 pm, ESPNU		at Maryland	L 66–92	5–6	Xfinity Center (13,646); College Park, MD
12/14/2016*; 6:00 pm		at Howard	W 72–59	6–6	Burr Gymnasium (100); Washington, D.C.
12/18/2016*; 2:00 pm		at USC Upstate	W 67–66	7–6	Hodge Center (512); Spartanburg, SC
12/21/2016*; 1:00 pm		at Chattanooga	L 57–73	7–7	McKenzie Arena (3,370); Chattanooga, TN
12/29/2016; 7:00 pm		at UT Martin	W 90–72	8–7 (1–0)	Skyhawk Arena (1,604); Martin, TN
12/31/2016; 3:15 pm		at Eastern Illinois	W 57–56	9–7 (2–0)	Lantz Arena (1,059); Charleston, IL
01/05/2017; 7:30 pm		Murray State	L 63–76	9–8 (2–1)	Pete Mathews Coliseum (2,206); Jacksonville, AL
01/07/2017; 7:00 pm		Austin Peay	W 71–68	10–8 (3–1)	Pete Mathews Coliseum (1,504); Jacksonville, AL
01/10/2017*; 7:00 pm		Fort Valley State	W 81–69	11–8	Pete Mathews Coliseum; Jacksonville, AL
01/14/2017; 7:30 pm		at Tennessee Tech	W 74–59	12–8 (4–1)	Eblen Center (2,882); Cookeville, TN
01/19/2017; 7:00 pm		at Belmont	L 60–77	12–9 (4–2)	Curb Event Center (1,680); Nashville, TN
01/21/2017; 7:30 pm		at Tennessee State	W 86–79	13–9 (5–2)	Gentry Complex (5,106); Nashville, TN
01/26/2017; 7:00 pm		Eastern Kentucky	L 52–57	13–10 (5–3)	Pete Mathews Coliseum (1,552); Jacksonville, AL
01/28/2017; 11:00 am, ASN		Morehead State	L 69–72	13–11 (5–4)	Pete Mathews Coliseum (1,021); Jacksonville, AL
02/01/2017; 7:00 pm		Southeast Missouri State	W 74–62	14–11 (6–4)	Pete Mathews Coliseum (1,011); Jacksonville, AL
02/04/2017; 7:00 pm		at SIU Edwardsville	W 72–61	15–11 (7–4)	Vadalabene Center (1,203); Edwardsville, IL
02/09/2017; 6:00 pm, CBSSN		Belmont	L 53–66	15–12 (7–5)	Pete Mathews Coliseum (2,370); Jacksonville, AL
02/11/2017; 4:30 pm		Tennessee State	W 63–57	16–12 (8–5)	Pete Mathews Coliseum (1,920); Jacksonville, AL
02/18/2017; 7:00 pm		Tennessee Tech	L 78–79 ^{OT}	16–13 (8–6)	Pete Mathews Coliseum (1,822); Jacksonville, AL
02/23/2017; 6:00 pm		at Eastern Kentucky	L 65–68	16–14 (8–7)	McBrayer Arena (1,600); Richmond, KY
02/25/2017; 3:15 pm		at Morehead State	W 70–61	17–14 (9–7)	Ellis Johnson Arena (734); Morehead, KY
Ohio Valley Conference tournament
03/02/2017; 6:30 pm	(4)	vs. (5) Southeast Missouri State; Quarterfinals	W 74–51	18–14	Nashville Municipal Auditorium (1,001); Nashville, TN
03/03/2017; 6:30 pm, ESPNU	(4)	vs. (1) Belmont; Semifinals	W 65–59	19–14	Nashville Municipal Auditorium (2,355); Nashville, TN
03/04/2017; 7:00 pm, ESPN2	(4)	vs. (2) UT Martin; Championship	W 66–55	20–14	Nashville Municipal Auditorium (1,303); Nashville, TN
NCAA tournament
03/17/17; 1:45 pm, CBS	(15 MW)	vs. (2 MW) No. 10 Louisville; First Round	L 63–78	20–15	Bankers Life Fieldhouse (18,255); Indianapolis, IN
*Non-conference game. ^{#}Rankings from AP Poll. (#) Tournament seedings in parentheses. MW=Midwest Region. All times are in Central Time. Source
