= 2016–17 Eastern Illinois Panthers men's basketball team =

American college basketball season

2016–17 Eastern Illinois Panthers men's basketball
- Conference: Ohio Valley Conference
- West Division
- Record: 14–15 (6–10 OVC)
- Head coach: Jay Spoonhour (5th season)
- Assistant coaches: Rand Chappell; J.R. Renolds; Rob Holloway
- Home arena: Lantz Arena

2016–17 Ohio Valley Conference men's basketball standings
| | Conf. | | | | Overall |
| Team | W | | L | PCT | W | | L | PCT |
|---|---|---|---|---|---|---|---|---|
East
| Belmont | 15 | – | 1 | .938 | 23 | – | 7 | .767 |
| Morehead State | 10 | – | 6 | .625 | 14 | – | 16 | .467 |
| Jacksonville State † | 9 | – | 7 | .563 | 20 | – | 15 | .571 |
| Tennessee State | 8 | – | 8 | .500 | 17 | – | 13 | .567 |
| Tennessee Tech | 8 | – | 8 | .500 | 12 | – | 20 | .375 |
| Eastern Kentucky | 5 | – | 11 | .313 | 12 | – | 19 | .387 |
West
| UT Martin | 10 | – | 6 | .625 | 22 | – | 13 | .629 |
| Southeast Missouri St. | 9 | – | 7 | .563 | 15 | – | 18 | .455 |
| Murray State | 8 | – | 8 | .500 | 16 | – | 17 | .485 |
| Austin Peay | 7 | – | 9 | .438 | 11 | – | 19 | .367 |
| Eastern Illinois | 6 | – | 10 | .375 | 14 | – | 15 | .483 |
| SIU Edwardsville | 1 | – | 15 | .063 | 6 | – | 24 | .200 |
† 2017 OVC tournament winner

The 2016–17 Eastern Illinois Panthers men's basketball team represented Eastern Illinois University during the 2016–17 NCAA Division I men's basketball season. The Panthers, led by fifth-year head coach Jay Spoonhour, played their home games at Lantz Arena and were members of the West Division of the Ohio Valley Conference. They finished the season 14–15, 6–10 in OVC play to finish in fifth place in the West Division. They failed to qualify for the Ohio Valley Conference tournament.

== Previous season ==
The Panthers finished the 2015–16 season 13–17, 9–7 in OVC play to finish in third place in the West Division. They lost in the first round of the OVC tournament to Murray State.

== Preseason ==
In a vote of Ohio Valley Conference head men’s basketball coaches and sports information directors, Eastern Illinois was picked to finish second in the West Division of the OVC. Cornell Johnston was selected to the All-OVC Preseason Team.

== Roster ==
2016–17 Eastern Illinois Panthers men's basketball team
Players
Coaches

| Pos. | # | Name | Height | Weight | Year | Hometown |
|---|---|---|---|---|---|---|
| G | 1 | Demetrius McReynolds | 6 ft 2 in (1.88 m) | 210 lb (95 kg) | Sr | Louisville, Kentucky |
| G | 2 | Cornell Johnston | 5 ft 7 in (1.7 m) | 150 lb (68 kg) | Jr | St. Louis, Missouri |
| G | 3 | Casey Teson | 6 ft 2 in (1.88 m) | 190 lb (86 kg) | So | St. Charles, Missouri |
| G | 4 | Montell Goodwin | 6 ft 2 in (1.88 m) | 190 lb (86 kg) | Jr | Cleveland, Ohio |
| G/F | 5 | Ray Crossland | 6 ft 6 in (1.98 m) | 220 lb (100 kg) | Jr | St. Louis, Missouri |
| G | 11 | Logan Koch | 6 ft 1 in (1.85 m) | 200 lb (91 kg) | Fr | Shawnee, Kansas |
| G/F | 12 | Marshawn Blackmon | 6 ft 5 in (1.96 m) | 200 lb (91 kg) | So | St. Peters, Missouri |
| G | 21 | DeVantae' Price | 6 ft 2 in (1.88 m) | 190 lb (86 kg) | RS Jr | Tamms, Illinois |
| F | 24 | Joe Kuligoski | 6 ft 6 in (1.98 m) | 220 lb (100 kg) | RS Sr | Orland Park, Illinois |
| F | 25 | Muusa Dama | 6 ft 9 in (2.06 m) | 225 lb (102 kg) | Jr | Parakou, Benin |
| F | 32 | Patrick Muldoon | 6 ft 7 in (2.01 m) | 215 lb (98 kg) | So | Basehor, Kansas |
| F | 40 | Lucas Jones | 6 ft 8 in (2.03 m) | 205 lb (93 kg) | So | Prairie Village, Kansas |
| F | 54 | Justin Earls | 6 ft 7 in (2.01 m) | 220 lb (100 kg) | Jr | Chicago, Illinois |
| F | 55 | Aboubacar Diallo | 6 ft 9 in (2.06 m) | 200 lb (91 kg) | So | Abidjan, Ivory Coast |

Head coach

- Jay Spoonhour (Pittsburg State)

Assistant coach(es)

- Rand Chappell (Missouri State)
- J.R. Reynolds (Eastern Illinois)
- Rob Holloway (Eastern Illinois)

Legend

- (C) Team captain
- (S) Suspended
- (I) Ineligible
- (W) Walk-on
- Injured
- Current redshirt

Roster

== Schedule and results ==
| Date time, TV | Opponent | Result | Record | Site (attendance) city, state |
Exhibition
| 11/06/2016*; 3:00 pm | Eureka | W 94–58 | | Lantz Arena (684); Charleston, IL |
Non-conference regular season
| 11/11/2016*; 7:30 pm | St. Francis (IL) | W 83–41 | 1–0 | Lantz Arena (1,038); Charleston, IL |
| 11/14/2016*; 7:00 pm | at Troy | L 67–70 | 1–1 | Trojan Arena (905); Troy, AL |
| 11/17/2016*; 7:00 pm | at Saint Louis | L 69–74 | 1–2 | Chaifetz Arena (4,948); St. Louis, MO |
| 11/19/2016*; 7:00 pm | Western Illinois | W 73–64 | 2–2 | Lantz Arena (392); Charleston, IL |
| 11/21/2016*; 12:00 pm, WEIU | Troy | W 71–67 | 3–2 | Lantz Arena (3,111); Charleston, IL |
| 11/26/2016*; 3:15 pm | South Alabama | W 72–62 | 4–2 | Lantz Arena (835); Charleston, IL |
| 11/29/2016*; 7:00 pm, WEIU | Bradley | L 83–87 ^{OT} | 4–3 | Lantz Arena; Charleston, IL |
| 12/03/2016*; 3:00 pm, ESPN3 | at UIC | W 90–76 | 5–3 | UIC Pavilion (1,786); Chicago, IL |
| 12/07/2016*; 6:00 pm, ESPN3 | at Northern Kentucky | L 70–80 | 5–4 | BB&T Arena (1,965); Highland Heights, KY |
| 12/10/2016*; 2:00 pm | at Western Illinois | W 63–49 | 6–4 | Western Hall (1,002); Macomb, IL |
| 12/17/2016*; 2:30 pm, SECN | at Missouri | W 63–49 | 7–4 | Mizzou Arena (1,002); Columbia, MO |
| 12/19/2016*; 7:00 pm | Fontbonne | W 101–49 | 8–4 | Lantz Arena (501); Charleston, IL |
| 12/21/2016*; 4:30 pm | at Indiana State | L 85–88 ^{2OT} | 8–5 | Hulman Center (3,315); Terre Haute, IN |
Ohio Valley Conference regular season
| 12/31/2016; 3:15 pm | Jacksonville State | L 56–57 | 8–6 (0–1) | Lantz Arena (1,059); Charleston, IL |
| 01/05/2017; 6:45 pm | at Morehead State | L 75–85 | 8–7 (0–2) | Ellis Johnson Arena (1,591); Morehead, KY |
| 01/07/2017; 1:00 pm | at Eastern Kentucky | W 74–60 | 9–7 (1–2) | McBrayer Arena (1,300); Richmond, KY |
| 01/12/2017; 7:00 pm | Murray State | L 72–83 | 9–8 (1–3) | Lantz Arena (1,531); Charleston, IL |
| 01/14/2017; 11:00 am, ASN | Austin Peay | L 84–92 | 9–9 (1–4) | Lantz Arena (1,209); Charleston, IL |
| 01/19/2017; 7:00 pm | at UT Martin | L 71–82 ^{2OT} | 9–10 (1–5) | Skyhawk Arena (1,507); Martin, TN |
| 01/21/2017; 4:15 pm | at Southeast Missouri State | L 71–83 | 9–11 (1–6) | Show Me Center (1,968); Cape Girardeau, MO |
| 01/25/2017; 7:00 pm | Belmont | L 64–77 | 9–12 (1–7) | Lantz Arena (1,333); Charleston, IL |
| 01/28/2017; 3:15 pm, WEIU | SIU Edwardsville | W 75–60 | 10–12 (2–7) | Lantz Arena (1,417); Charleston, IL |
| 02/02/2017; 7:00 pm, CBSSN | at Tennessee State | W 77–67 ^{OT} | 11–12 (3–7) | Gentry Complex (3,931); Nashville, TN |
| 02/04/2017; 3:15 pm, WEIU | Tennessee Tech | L 68–87 | 11–13 (3–8) | Lantz Arena (1,077); Charleston, IL |
| 02/09/2017; 7:00 pm | UT Martin | W 81–71 | 12–13 (4–8) | Lantz Arena (1,678); Charleston, IL |
| 02/11/2017; 1:00 pm, ASN | Southeast Missouri State | W 86–80 ^{OT} | 13–13 (5–8) | Lantz Arena (1,992); Charleston, IL |
| 02/16/2017; 7:00 pm | at Austin Peay | L 80–85 | 13–14 (5–9) | Dunn Center (1,549); Clarksville, TN |
| 02/18/2017; 7:00 pm | at Murray State | W 82–65 | 14–14 (6–9) | CFSB Center (4,402); Murray, KY |
| 02/25/2017; 7:00 pm, WEIU | at SIU Edwardsville | L 59–78 | 14–15 (6–10) | Vadalabene Center (1,805); Edwardsville, IL |
*Non-conference game. ^{#}Rankings from AP Poll. (#) Tournament seedings in parentheses. All times are in Central Time.
