= 2016–17 Morehead State Eagles men's basketball team =

American college basketball season

2016–17 Morehead State Eagles men's basketball
- Conference: Ohio Valley Conference
- East Division
- Record: 14–16 (10–6 OVC)
- Head coach: Preston Spradlin, interim
- Assistant coaches: Dylan Howard; Derrick Tilmon
- Home arena: Ellis Johnson Arena

2016–17 Ohio Valley Conference men's basketball standings
	Conf.				Overall
Team	W		L	PCT	W		L	PCT
East
Belmont	15	–	1	.938	23	–	7	.767
Morehead State	10	–	6	.625	14	–	16	.467
Jacksonville State †	9	–	7	.563	20	–	15	.571
Tennessee State	8	–	8	.500	17	–	13	.567
Tennessee Tech	8	–	8	.500	12	–	20	.375
Eastern Kentucky	5	–	11	.313	12	–	19	.387
West
UT Martin	10	–	6	.625	22	–	13	.629
Southeast Missouri St.	9	–	7	.563	15	–	18	.455
Murray State	8	–	8	.500	16	–	17	.485
Austin Peay	7	–	9	.438	11	–	19	.367
Eastern Illinois	6	–	10	.375	14	–	15	.483
SIU Edwardsville	1	–	15	.063	6	–	24	.200
† 2017 OVC tournament winner

The 2016–17 Morehead State Eagles men's basketball team represented Morehead State University during the 2016–17 NCAA Division I men's basketball season. The Eagles, led by interim head coach Preston Spradlin, played their home games at Ellis Johnson Arena in Morehead, Kentucky as members of the East Division of the Ohio Valley Conference. The Eagles finished the season 14–16, 10–6 in OVC play to finish in second place in the East Division. In the OVC tournament they lost to Murray State in the quarterfinals.

On November 22, 2016, Morehead State suspended head coach Sean Woods with pay while the school investigated complaints made against Woods. Assistant coach Preston Spradlin was named interim head coach. On December 15, two days after Woods was charged with misdemeanor battery in Indiana for allegedly assaulting two of his players during a game versus Evansville, it was announced that Woods had resigned. It was announced that Spradlin would continue as interim coach while the school conducted a nationwide search for a replacement. On March 16, 2017, Spradlin was named full-time head coach.

== Previous season ==
The Eagles finished the 2015–16 season 23–14, 11–5 in OVC play to finish in a three-way tie for second place in the East Division. They defeated Murray State in the quarterfinals of the OVC tournament to advance to the semifinals where they lost to UT Martin. They were invited to the College Basketball Invitational where they defeated Siena, Duquesne, and Ohio to advance to the best-of-three finals series against Nevada. In the finals, they lost the CIT championship two games to one.

== Preseason ==
In a vote of Ohio Valley Conference head men's basketball coaches and sports information directors, Morehead State was picked to finish third in the East Division of the OVC. Xavier Moon was selected to the All-OVC Preseason Team.

== Roster ==
2016–17 Morehead State Eagles men's basketball team
Players
Coaches

Pos.	#	Name	Height	Weight	Year	Previous school	Hometown
F	0	Ty'Quan Bitting	6 ft 9 in (2.06 m)	220 lb (100 kg)	Sr	Mount Tabor High School; Angelina College	Winston-Salem, North Carolina
F	1	Treshaad Williams	6 ft 5 in (1.96 m)	235 lb (107 kg)	Sr	Berrien County; Northwest Florida State College	Nashville, GA
G	2	Jordan Walker	6 ft 1 in (1.85 m)	177 lb (80 kg)	Fr	Cathedral	Indianapolis, IN
C	3	Keion Alexander	6 ft 10 in (2.08 m)	210 lb (95 kg)	RS Jr	Kingdom Prep Academy (GA); Southwest Tennessee CC	Brooklyn, NY
G	5	Miguel Dicent	6 ft 3 in (1.91 m)	155 lb (70 kg)	Jr	Canarias Academy	Santo Domingo, DR
F	10	Alonzo Chatman	6 ft 7 in (2.01 m)	200 lb (91 kg)	Fr	Morgan Park	Chicago, IL
G	11	Malik Maitland	5 ft 11 in (1.8 m)	170 lb (77 kg)	So	Father Lopez Catholic	Daytona Beach, FL
F	13	Lamontray Harris	6 ft 7 in (2.01 m)	210 lb (95 kg)	So	Pleasure Ridge Park; Robinson Prep School (NJ)	Louisville, KY
F	15	Dejuan Marrero	6 ft 6 in (1.98 m)	230 lb (104 kg)	RS Sr	Bowman Academy; Chipola College	Gary, IN
F	21	Wes Noble	6 ft 5 in (1.96 m)	190 lb (86 kg)	RS So	Breathitt County	Jackson, KY
G	22	Xavier Moon	6 ft 2 in (1.88 m)	165 lb (75 kg)	Sr	Central Coosa; Northwest Florida State College	Goodwater, AL
G	23	Malik Winston	6 ft 4 in (1.93 m)	194 lb (88 kg)	Fr	Dundalk	Baltimore, MD
F	25	Ronnye Beamon	6 ft 5 in (1.96 m)	195 lb (88 kg)	Sr	Hammond Bishop Noll (IN); Kaskaskia College	Calumet City, IL
G	32	Djimon Henson	6 ft 3 in (1.91 m)	189 lb (86 kg)	Fr	Lawrence North	Indianapolis, IN
F	35	Soufiyane Diakite	6 ft 6 in (1.98 m)	192 lb (87 kg)	Jr	Wings Academy; Cowley CC (TX)	Bronx, NY

Head coach

- Preston Spradlin

Assistant coach(es)

- Dylan Howard
- Derrick Tilmon

Legend

- (C) Team captain
- (S) Suspended
- (I) Ineligible
- (W) Walk-on
- Injured
- Current redshirt

== Schedule and results ==
Date time, TV	Rank^{#}	Opponent^{#}	Result	Record	Site (attendance) city, state
Exhibition
11/06/2016*; 2:00 pm, OVC Digital Network		Cincinnati Christian	W 106–63		Ellis Johnson Arena; Morehead, KY
Non-conference regular season
11/11/2016*; 7:45 pm, OVC Digital Network		Kentucky Christian	W 106–41	1–0	Ellis Johnson Arena (2,865); Morehead, KY
11/13/2016*; 4:00 pm, OVC Digital Network		Lipscomb	W 89–75	2–0	Ellis Johnson Arena (1,783); Morehead, KY
11/16/2016*; 7:00 pm		at Marshall	L 77–85	2–1	Cam Henderson Center (5,872); Huntington, WV
11/19/2016*; 1:00 pm		at Evansville	L 56–69	2–2	Ford Center (3,836); Evansville, IN
11/25/2016*; 7:00 pm, ACCN Extra		at Pittsburgh	L 63–76	2–3	Petersen Events Center (7,025); Pittsburgh, PA
11/30/2016*; 7:00 pm		Northern Kentucky	L 79–84	2–4	Ellis Johnson Arena (3,110); Morehead, KY
12/03/2016*; 2:00 pm, ESPN3		at No. 15 Purdue	L 56–90	2–5	Mackey Arena (13,611); West Lafayette, IN
12/10/2016*; 5:00 pm, ESPN3		at Lipscomb	L 84–98	2–6	Allen Arena (1,302); Nashville, TN
12/13/2016*; 9:05 pm		at Eastern Washington	L 86–88	2–7	Reese Court (1,046); Cheney, WA
12/17/2016*; 2:00 pm		East Tennessee State	L 68–78	2–8	Ellis Johnson Arena (1,812); Morehead, KY
12/19/2016*; 7:30 pm		Central Arkansas	W 111–85	3–8	Ellis Johnson Arena (1,505); Morehead, KY
12/22/2016*; 7:00 pm, SECN		at Mississippi State	L 76–85	3–9	Humphrey Coliseum (8,328); Starkville, MS
12/28/2016*; 7:00 pm		Asbury	W 120–77	4–9	Ellis Johnson Arena (1,023); Morehead, KY
Ohio Valley Conference regular season
12/31/2016; 7:00 pm		at UT Martin	L 77–81 ^{OT}	4–10 (0–1)	Skyhawk Arena (1,730); Martin, TN
01/05/2017; 7:45 pm		Eastern Illinois	W 85–75	5–10 (1–1)	Ellis Johnson Arena (1,591); Morehead, KY
01/07/2017; 4:15 pm		SIU Edwardsville	W 73–65	6–10 (2–1)	Ellis Johnson Arena (2,531); Morehead, KY
01/12/2017; 8:00 pm, ESPNU		Belmont	L 78–84	6–11 (2–2)	Ellis Johnson Arena (3,244); Morehead, KY
01/14/2017; 7:45 pm		Tennessee State	W 87–85	7–11 (3–2)	Ellis Johnson Arena (2,858); Morehead, KY
01/19/2017; 8:00 pm		at Austin Peay	W 89–82	8–11 (4–2)	Dunn Center (1,767); Clarksville, TN
01/21/2017; 7:45 pm		Eastern Kentucky	W 80–54	9–11 (5–2)	Ellis Johnson Arena (5,789); Morehead, KY
01/26/2017; 7:00 pm		at Tennessee Tech	L 73–76	9–12 (5–3)	Eblen Center (1,644); Cookeville, TN
01/28/2017; 12:00 pm, ASN		at Jacksonville State	W 72–69	10–12 (6–3)	Pete Mathews Coliseum (1,021); Jacksonville, AL
02/04/2017; 5:15 pm		at Southeast Missouri State	W 89–81	11–12 (7–3)	Show Me Center (2,919); Cape Girardeau, MO
02/08/2017; 7:00 pm		Murray State	W 101–100 ^{OT}	12–12 (8–3)	Ellis Johnson Arena (4,109); Morehead, KY
02/11/2017; 7:00 pm		at Eastern Kentucky	W 67–62	13–12 (9–3)	McBrayer Arena (3,800); Richmond, VA
02/16/2017; 9:00 pm, ESPNU		at Tennessee State	L 52–64	13–13 (9–4)	Gentry Complex (3,765); Nashville, TN
02/18/2017; 5:00 pm		at Belmont	L 73–89	13–14 (9–5)	Curb Event Center (2,825); Nashville, TN
02/23/2017; 9:00 pm, CBSSN		Tennessee Tech	W 73–68	14–14 (10–5)	Ellis Johnson Arena (3,383); Morehead, KY
02/25/2017; 4:15 pm		Jacksonville State	L 61–70	14–15 (10–6)	Ellis Johnson Arena (734); Morehead, KY
Ohio Valley tournament
03/02/2017; 9:30 pm	(3)	vs. (7) Murray State; Quarterfinals	L 69–75	14–16	Nashville Municipal Auditorium (1,001); Nashville, TN
*Non-conference game. (#) Tournament seedings in parentheses. All times are in Eastern Time.
