= 2017 Ohio Valley Conference men's basketball tournament =

- Classification: Division I
- Season: 2016–17
- Teams: 8
- Site: Nashville Municipal Auditorium; Nashville, Tennessee
- Champions: Jacksonville State (1st title)
- Winning coach: Ray Harper (1st title)
- MVP: Malcolm Drumwright (Jacksonville State)
- Television: OVCDN/ESPN3, ESPNU, ESPN2

2016–17 Ohio Valley Conference men's basketball standings
	Conf.				Overall
Team	W		L	PCT	W		L	PCT
East
Belmont	15	–	1	.938	23	–	7	.767
Morehead State	10	–	6	.625	14	–	16	.467
Jacksonville State †	9	–	7	.563	20	–	15	.571
Tennessee State	8	–	8	.500	17	–	13	.567
Tennessee Tech	8	–	8	.500	12	–	20	.375
Eastern Kentucky	5	–	11	.313	12	–	19	.387
West
UT Martin	10	–	6	.625	22	–	13	.629
Southeast Missouri St.	9	–	7	.563	15	–	18	.455
Murray State	8	–	8	.500	16	–	17	.485
Austin Peay	7	–	9	.438	11	–	19	.367
Eastern Illinois	6	–	10	.375	14	–	15	.483
SIU Edwardsville	1	–	15	.063	6	–	24	.200
† 2017 OVC tournament winner

The 2017 Ohio Valley Conference men's basketball tournament was the conference tournament for the Ohio Valley Conference. The tournament was held March 1–4, 2017 at Nashville Municipal Auditorium in Nashville, Tennessee. Jacksonville State defeated UT Martin, 66–55, in championship game to win the tournament and earn the conference's automatic bid to the NCAA tournament.

== Seeds ==
Only the top eight teams in the conference qualified for the Tournament. The No. 1 and No. 2 seeds went to the division champions. The No. 1 and No. 2 seeds also received double byes to the semifinals under the merit-based format. The No. 3 and No. 4 seeds received a single bye to the quarterfinals.

Teams were seeded by record within the division and conference, with a tiebreaker system to seed teams with identical conference records.

Seed	School	Conference	Tiebreaker
1	Belmont	15–1	
2	UT Martin	10–6	West Division Champion
3	Morehead State	10–6	
4	Jacksonville State	9–7	1–0 vs. Southeast Missouri State
5	Southeast Missouri State	9–7	0–1 vs. Jacksonville State
6	Tennessee Tech	8–8	2–1 vs. Murray State/Tennessee State
7	Murray State	8–8	1–1 vs. Tennessee Tech/Tennessee State
8	Tennessee State	8–8	1–2 vs. Tennessee Tech/Murray State

== Schedule ==
Game	Time	Matchup	Score	Television
First round – Wednesday, March 1
1	6:30 pm	No. 5 Southeast Missouri State vs No. 8 Tennessee State	78–75 ^{OT}	OVC Digital Network
2	8:30 pm	No. 6 Tennessee Tech vs No. 7 Murray State	85–84 ^{2OT}	OVC Digital Network
Quarterfinals – Thursday, March 2
3	6:30 pm	No. 5 Southeast Missouri State vs No. 4 Jacksonville State	51–74	OVC Digital Network
4	8:30 pm	No. 7 Murray State vs No. 3 Morehead State	75–69	OVC Digital Network
Semifinals – Friday, March 3
5	6:30 pm	No. 4 Jacksonville State vs No. 1 Belmont	65–59	ESPNU
6	9:00 pm	No. 7 Murray State vs No. 2 UT Martin	73–67	ESPNU
Championship – Saturday, March 4
7	7:00 pm	No. 4 Jacksonville State vs No. 2 UT Martin	66–55	ESPN2
All game times in Central Time Zone.

== Bracket ==
First round Wednesday, March 1 OVCDN
5	SE Missouri State	78*
8	Tennessee State	75
6	Tennessee Tech	84
7	Murray State	85**

Quarterfinals; Thursday, March 2 OVCDN
4	Jacksonville State	74
5	SE Missouri State	51
3	Morehead State	69
7	Murray State	75

Semifinals; Friday, March 3 ESPNU
1	Belmont	59
4	Jacksonville State	65
2	UT Martin	73
7	Murray State	67

Championship; Saturday, March 4 ESPN2
4	Jacksonville State	66
2	UT Martin	55

* denotes number of overtime periods

== See also ==
- 2017 Ohio Valley Conference women's basketball tournament
