= 2016–17 Belmont Bruins men's basketball team =

American college basketball season

2016–17 Belmont Bruins men's basketball

OVC regular-season champions OVC East Division champions

NIT, second round
- Conference: Ohio Valley Conference
- East Division
- Record: 23–7 (15–1 OVC)
- Head coach: Rick Byrd (31st season)
- Assistant coaches: Brian Ayers; James Strong; Mark Price
- Home arena: Curb Event Center

2016–17 Ohio Valley Conference men's basketball standings
	Conf.				Overall
Team	W		L	PCT	W		L	PCT
East
Belmont	15	–	1	.938	23	–	7	.767
Morehead State	10	–	6	.625	14	–	16	.467
Jacksonville State †	9	–	7	.563	20	–	15	.571
Tennessee State	8	–	8	.500	17	–	13	.567
Tennessee Tech	8	–	8	.500	12	–	20	.375
Eastern Kentucky	5	–	11	.313	12	–	19	.387
West
UT Martin	10	–	6	.625	22	–	13	.629
Southeast Missouri St.	9	–	7	.563	15	–	18	.455
Murray State	8	–	8	.500	16	–	17	.485
Austin Peay	7	–	9	.438	11	–	19	.367
Eastern Illinois	6	–	10	.375	14	–	15	.483
SIU Edwardsville	1	–	15	.063	6	–	24	.200
† 2017 OVC tournament winner

The 2016–17 Belmont Bruins men's basketball team represented Belmont University during the 2016–17 NCAA Division I men's basketball season. The Bruins, led by 31st-year head coach Rick Byrd, played their home games at the Curb Event Center in Nashville, Tennessee as members of the Ohio Valley Conference (OVC) in the East Division. They finished the season 23–7, 15–1 in OVC play, to win the regular-season championship. In the OVC tournament, they lost in the semifinals to Jacksonville State. As a regular-season conference champion who failed to win their conference tournament title, they received an automatic bid to the National Invitation Tournament where they defeated Georgia in the first round before losing to Georgia Tech.

== Previous season ==
The Bruins finished the 2015–16 season 20–12, 12–4 in OVC play, to win the East Division and the overall OVC regular season. They lost in the semifinals of the OVC tournament to Austin Peay. As a regular-season conference champion who failed to win their conference tournament, they received an automatic bid to the National Invitation Tournament where they lost in the first round to Georgia.

== Preseason ==
In a vote of Ohio Valley Conference head men’s basketball coaches and sports information directors, Belmont was picked to finish as regular-season champions of the OVC for the third time in the last four years. Reigning OVC Player of the Year, Evan Bradds, was named OVC Preseason Player of the Year for the 2016–17 season. Taylor Barnette was also selected to the All-OVC Preseason Team.

== Roster ==
2016–17 Belmont Bruins men's basketball team
Players
Coaches

Pos.	#	Name	Height	Weight	Year	Hometown
G	1	Austin Luke	6 ft 3 in (1.91 m)	200 lb (91 kg)	RS Jr	Rowlett, TX
F	2	Nick Smith	6 ft 8 in (2.03 m)	220 lb (100 kg)	Sr	Bentonville, AR
G/F	3	Dylan Windler	6 ft 7 in (2.01 m)	190 lb (86 kg)	So	Indianapolis, IN
F	11	Kevin McClain	6 ft 2 in (1.88 m)	180 lb (82 kg)	So	Jennings, FL
G	14	Nick Hopkins	5 ft 11 in (1.8 m)	155 lb (70 kg)	Fr	Fayetteville, TN
G	20	Taylor Barnette	6 ft 3 in (1.91 m)	185 lb (84 kg)	Sr	Lexington, KY
G	21	Burton Sampson (W)	6 ft 4 in (1.93 m)	195 lb (88 kg)	RS Jr	Knoxville, TN
G	24	Micahel Benkert	6 ft 4 in (1.93 m)	195 lb (88 kg)	RS Fr	Greenwood, IN
F	25	Mack Mercer	6 ft 9 in (2.06 m)	225 lb (102 kg)	Jr	Plymouth, IN
F	31	Josh Lester (W)	6 ft 6 in (1.98 m)	225 lb (102 kg)	RS Jr	Antioch, TN
F	32	Amanze Egekeze	6 ft 8 in (2.03 m)	220 lb (100 kg)	Jr	Lake in the Hills, IL
F	35	Evan Bradds	6 ft 7 in (2.01 m)	205 lb (93 kg)	RS Sr	Jamestown, OH
C	41	Tyler Hadden	6 ft 10 in (2.08 m)	240 lb (109 kg)	RS Jr	Cincinnati, OH
C	50	Seth Adelsperger	6 ft 11 in (2.11 m)	215 lb (98 kg)	RS Fr	Peru, IN

Head coach

- Rick Byrd (Tennessee)

Assistant coach(es)

- Brian Ayers (Lipscomb)
- James Strong (Vanderbilt)
- Mark Price (Samford)

Legend

- (C) Team captain
- (S) Suspended
- (I) Ineligible
- (W) Walk-on
- Injured
- Current redshirt

Roster
Last update: August 15, 2024

== Schedule and results ==
Date time, TV	Rank^{#}	Opponent^{#}	Result	Record	Site (attendance) city, state
Regular season
November 15, 2016*; 8:00 p.m., SECN		at Vanderbilt	L 66–80	0–1	Memorial Gymnasium (9,116); Nashville, TN
November 19, 2016*; 7:00 p.m.		WKU	W 90–69	1–1	Curb Event Center (3,319); Nashville, TN
November 21, 2016*; 6:00 p.m., SECN		vs. Florida; AdvoCare Invitational opening round	L 61–78	1–2	Amalie Arena (6,650); Tampa, FL
November 25, 2016*; 6:00 p.m.		at No. 23 Rhode Island	L 73–82	1–3	Ryan Center (4,626); Kingston, RI
November 29, 2016*; 7:00 p.m.		Lipscomb; Battle of the Boulevard	W 64–62	2–3	Curb Event Center (2,863); Nashville, TN
December 3, 2016*; 7:00 p.m.		at Pepperdine	W 85–77	3–3	Firestone Fieldhouse (1,340); Malibu, CA
December 6, 2016*; 6:30 p.m.		at Lipscomb; Battle of the Boulevard	W 78–76 ^{OT}	4–3	Allen Arena (2,908); Nashville, TN
December 14, 2016*; 7:00 p.m.		Middle Tennessee	L 66–79	4–4	Curb Event Center (2,469); Nashville, TN
December 17, 2016*; 4:30 p.m.		at Green Bay; Postponed (snow), no makeup date announced			Resch Center; Green Bay, WI
December 19, 2016*; 7:00 p.m., ESPN3		at Milwaukee	W 62–56	5–4	UW–Milwaukee Panther Arena (1,127); Milwaukee, WI
December 22, 2016*; 7:00 p.m.		Cleveland State	W 88–61	6–4	Curb Event Center (2,024); Nashville, TN
December 31, 2016; 2:30 p.m.		at Austin Peay	W 82–77	7–4 (1–0)	Dunn Center (1,757); Clarksville, TN
January 5, 2017; 6:00 p.m.		UT Martin	W 83–67	8–4 (2–0)	Curb Event Center (1,746); Nashville, TN
January 7, 2017; 7:00 p.m.		Southeast Missouri State	W 87–75	9–4 (3–0)	Curb Event Center (2,017); Nashville, TN
January 12, 2017; 6:00 p.m., ESPNU		at Morehead State	W 84–78	10–4 (4–0)	Ellis Johnson Arena (3,244); Morehead, KY
January 14, 2017; 6:00 p.m.		at Eastern Kentucky	W 72–59	11–4 (5–0)	McBrayer Arena (2,300); Richmond, KY
January 19, 2017; 7:00 p.m.		Jacksonville State	W 77–60	12–4 (6–0)	Curb Event Center (1,680); Nashville, TN
January 21, 2017; 11:00 a.m., ASN		Tennessee Tech	W 82–70	13–4 (7–0)	Curb Event Center (2,061); Nashville, TN
January 25, 2017; 7:00 p.m.		at Eastern Illinois	W 77–64	14–4 (8–0)	Lantz Arena (1,333); Charleston, IL
January 28, 2017; 7:30 p.m.		at Tennessee State	W 93–76	15–4 (9–0)	Gentry Complex (7,103); Nashville, TN
January 30, 2017; 8:00 p.m., CBSSN		SIU Edwardsville	W 92–69	16–4 (10–0)	Curb Event Center (1,230); Nashville, TN
February 2, 2017; 8:00 p.m., ESPNU		at Murray State	W 81–69	17–4 (11–0)	CFSB Center (5,041); Murray, KY
February 9, 2017; 6:00 p.m., CBSSN		at Jacksonville State	W 66–53	18–4 (12–0)	Pete Mathews Coliseum (2,370); Jacksonville, AL
February 11, 2017; 7:30 p.m.		at Tennessee Tech	L 70–83	18–5 (12–1)	Eblen Center (3,879); Cookeville, TN
February 16, 2017; 7:00 p.m.		Eastern Kentucky	W 76–72	19–5 (13–1)	Curb Event Center (2,705); Nashville, TN
February 18, 2017; 4:00 p.m.		Morehead State	W 89–73	20–5 (14–1)	Curb Event Center (2,825); Nashville, TN
February 21, 2017*; 7:00 p.m.		Trevecca Nazarene	W 96–45	21–5	Curb Event Center (1,804); Nashville, TN
February 25, 2017; 5:00 p.m.		Tennessee State	W 68–63	22–5 (15–1)	Curb Event Center (4,458); Nashville, TN
Ohio Valley Conference tournament
March 3, 2017; 6:30 p.m., ESPNU	(1)	vs. (4) Jacksonville State; Semifinals	L 59–65	22–6	Nashville Municipal Auditorium (2,355); Nashville, TN
NIT
March 15, 2017*; 6:00 p.m., ESPN3	(7)	at (2) Georgia; First round – Syracuse Bracket	W 78–69	23–6	Stegeman Coliseum (2,904); Athens, GA
March 19, 2017*; 11:00 a.m., ESPN	(7)	at (6) Georgia Tech; Second round – Syracuse Bracket	L 57–71	23–7	Hank McCamish Pavilion (7,176); Atlanta, GA
*Non-conference game. ^{#}Rankings from AP poll. (#) Tournament seedings in parentheses. All times are in Central.
