= Jay Spoonhour =

American basketball coach (born 1970)

Current position
- Title: Assistant Coach
- Team: Missouri State
- Conference: Missouri Valley

Biographical details
- Born: October 14, 1970 (age 56); Springfield, Missouri, U.S.

Playing career
- 1990–1994: Pittsburg State

Coaching career (HC unless noted)
- 1994–1996: Central Missouri State (GA)
- 1996–1999: Saint Louis (assistant)
- 2000: Valparaiso (assistant)
- 2000–2001: Wabash Valley
- 2001–2004: UNLV (assistant)
- 2004: UNLV (interim HC)
- 2004–2006: Missouri (assistant)
- 2006–2009: UTSA (assistant)
- 2009–2012: Moberly Area CC
- 2012–2021: Eastern Illinois
- 2023-Present: Missouri State (assistant)

Head coaching record
- Overall: 224–189 (college)
- Tournaments: 1–1 (CIT)

Accomplishments and honors

Championships
- NJCAA Division I (2001)

Jay Thomas Spoonhour (born October 14, 1970) is an American basketball coach. He was the head men's basketball coach at Eastern Illinois University, a position he had from 2012 until 2021. Previously, Spoonhour served as the head coach at Moberly Area Community College in Missouri. He has also held several assistant jobs, including at Saint Louis, UNLV, Missouri and Texas-San Antonio. He served as the interim head coach of the UNLV Runnin' Rebels in 2004 after his father, Charlie Spoonhour, resigned mid-season.

== Career ==
Spoonhour started his coaching career as a graduate assistant at Central Missouri State (1994–96). He then held assistant coaching positions at Valparaiso (2000) and Saint Louis (1996–1999) before accepting his first head coaching position at Wabash Valley College. In his one and only season at Wabash, he led the team to a 36-1 overall record and won the 2001 NJCAA Men's Division I Basketball Championship. He was named the National Junior College Coach of the Year by both the NABC and NJCAA.

Following the national title season, Spoonhour joined his father's staff at UNLV as an assistant. He spent three seasons in Las Vegas and in 2004, he took over as the interim head coach after his father resigned midseason. In the 10 games that the younger Spoonhour coached, the Runnin' Rebels went 6–4, including an appearance in the Mountain West Conference title game and an opening round loss in the 2004 NIT.

He then went on to spend two seasons as an assistant at Missouri and three as an assistant at Texas-San Antonio before being hired as the head coach of Moberly Area Community College in Moberly, Missouri. In his three years there (2009–12), Spoonhour had a record of 63–27.

On April 6, 2012, Spoonhour was hired as the next head men's basketball coach at Eastern Illinois University of the Ohio Valley Conference. Spoonhour was chosen over a list of final candidates that also included Vanderbilt assistant David Cason, Oregon assistant Brian Fish, Nevada assistant Doug Novsek and Xavier assistant Kareem Richardson.

In his first season as head coach, the Panthers finished 11–21 overall, but managed to make the conference tournament for the first time since the 2009–10 season. The Panthers were eliminated in the first round of the Ohio Valley Conference tournament by Southeast Missouri State.

== Personal life ==
Jay is the son of former Missouri State, Saint Louis and UNLV head coach Charlie Spoonhour. He graduated from Glendale High School (Springfield, Missouri) in 1989 and went on to earn a bachelor's degree in physical education from Pittsburg State University. He was a four-year letter winner in basketball at Pittsburg State, earning honorable mention all-conference honors as a senior. He is married to Nicole and has three children, Gracie, Charlie and Sam.

== Head coaching record ==
=== Junior college ===
Record table
Season	Team	Overall	Conference	Standing	Postseason
Wabash Valley Warriors (Great Rivers Athletic) (2000–2001)
2000–01	Wabash Valley	36–1		1st	NJCAA Division I Champion
Wabash Valley:		36–1 (.973)			
Moberly Greyhounds (Missouri Community College Athletic Conference) (2009–2012)
2009–10	Moberly	25–6			
2010–11	Moberly	17–13			
2011–12	Moberly	21–8			
Moberly:		63–27 (.700)			
Total:		99–28 (.780)			
National champion Postseason invitational champion Conference regular season champion Conference regular season and conference tournament champion Division regular season champion Division regular season and conference tournament champion Conference tournament champion

=== College ===
Record table
Season	Team	Overall	Conference	Standing	Postseason
UNLV Runnin' Rebels (Mountain West Conference) (2004)
2003–04	UNLV	6–4	4–2	4th	
UNLV:		6–4 (.600)	4–2 (.667)		
Eastern Illinois Panthers (Ohio Valley Conference) (2012–2021)
2012–13	Eastern Illinois	11–21	6–10	3rd (West)	
2013–14	Eastern Illinois	11–19	7–9	T–3rd (West)	
2014–15	Eastern Illinois	18–15	9–7	3rd (West)	CIT Second Round
2015–16	Eastern Illinois	13–17	9–7	3rd (West)	
2016–17	Eastern Illinois	14–15	6–10	5th (West)	
2017–18	Eastern Illinois	12–19	7–11	8th	
2018–19	Eastern Illinois	14–18	7–11	6th	
2019–20	Eastern Illinois	17–15	9–9	T–5th	
2020–21	Eastern Illinois	9–18	6–14	T–9th	
Eastern Illinois:		119–157 (.431)	66–88 (.429)		
Total:		125–161 (.437)			
