= Kansas City Force =

American women's gridiron football team

Logo

General information
- Founded: 2020 (franchise); 2022 (competition)
- Folded: 2022
- Stadium: Cable Dahmer Arena
- Headquartered: Independence, Missouri
- Colors: Light Blue, Black
- Website: xleague.live/kansas-city-force/

League / conference affiliations
- X League

The Kansas City Force were a women's American football team in the Extreme Football League (X League) based in Independence, Missouri, a suburb of Kansas City.

== History ==
In December 2019, it was announced that the Legends Football League (LFL) would be relaunched as the X League, or Extreme Football League, to begin play in April 2020. In January 2020, the Kansas City Force was established, in replacement of the Nashville Knights, an LFL franchise that would have migrated into the X League but was removed after missing several procedural deadlines for participating in the 2020 season.

Open tryouts for the Force were held at The Fieldhouse in Blue Springs, Missouri, on January 18, 2020, in preparation of the team's inaugural season. The team's 2020 season was planned to feature two home games, against the Omaha Red Devils and Los Angeles Black Storm, and two away games, against the Chicago Blitz and Seattle Thunder. However, the season never took place amidst the COVID-19 pandemic. The league also did not operate during 2021.

The Force first competed during the 2022 X League season, losing in overtime to the Chicago Blitz in the X League's first game. However, as the league preferred a matchup between two capable teams instead of a one-sided contest between a more-established team and a team of rookies, the league decided to replace the Force roster with coaches and players from the Atlanta Empire; Kansas City was assessed the loss while Atlanta personnel returned to compete for the Empire. The Force's other scheduled regular-season game, against the Arizona Red Devils, was canceled after the Red Devils suspended operations for the season. Kansas City did not advance to the X League's postseason.
