= Nashville Knights (football) =

Legends Football League franchise in Nashville, Tennessee, United States

General information
- Founded: December 2017 (franchise); April 2018 (competition)
- Folded: January 2020
- Stadium: Nashville Municipal Auditorium
- Headquartered: Nashville, Tennessee
- Colours: Sky blue, navy, white
- Website: lflus.com/nashvilleknights

Personnel
- Head coach: Yuri Howard

League / conference affiliations
- Legends Football League (2018–2019); Eastern Conference

The Nashville Knights were a women's American football team of the Legends Football League (LFL) based in Nashville, Tennessee. The team played its home games at Nashville Municipal Auditorium in downtown Nashville.

The Knights were the 22nd and final expansion team in the history of the LFL's U.S. league. The team was to become a franchise of the Extreme Football League (X League) in 2020, but missed several deadlines and the league suspended the team. The league replaced them with the Kansas City Force.

== History ==
The Nashville Knights used when the team was an LFL franchise from 2018 to 2019.

In 2010, the then-Lingerie Football League almost established a franchise for the Nashville area, but the plans were canceled due to a successful petition by locals to keep it out of the area. This was due to the controversy of the uniforms worn by LFL players when the league started. The league was renamed to reflect the fact that the uniforms became less revealing after the 2011–12 season.

Seven years later, the now-Legends Football League made the announcement that they would expand to include a Nashville-based franchise to be named as the Nashville Knights in April 2018. Former Seattle Mist tight end and middle linebacker Danika Brace was named the Knights' head coach. This made Brace the first female coach in the history of the LFL, and the first female to coach any kind of professional sports team in the Nashville area, as well as the first female to coach in any non-college sports team (pro or semipro) in the state of Tennessee. Brace also served as the general manager. The Knights replaced the Pittsburgh Rebellion as the fourth Eastern Conference team because the Rebellion began searching for a new home venue.

In December 2019, the LFL was rebranded as the Extreme Football League, which later became known as the X League). The Knights were the only LFL team to not change names in the transition to the X League and were scheduled for games against the Omaha Red Devils, Chicago Blitz, Los Angeles Black Storm, and the Seattle Thunder. However, on January 7, 2020, the league announced that the Knights had missed several procedural deadlines for participating in the 2020 season and was replaced by a new franchise, the Kansas City Force.

== Seasons ==
=== 2018 season ===
Open tryouts were held at D1 Sports in Franklin on December 9, 2017. The Knights' recruitment proceedings resulted in a rule change concerning free agency. The team recruited seven of the starters from defending champion Seattle Mist, where head coach Danika Brace also played in the previous season, essentially transplanting the Mist's lineup to a new team nearly intact. This move prompted the league to institute a rule only allowing five free agents per team. As a result of this rule change, the Knights franchise was forced to turn away two of their free agency recruits who returned to Seattle. Further controversy ensued when the Mist's former coach Chris Michaelson, who had retired in the off-season, reappeared as the offensive coordinator of the Knights.

The Knights went undefeated in the franchise's inaugural regular season with wins against Austin, defending Legends Cup champion Seattle, Denver, and Omaha. The road game against Seattle, however, was dubbed by Seattle Mist fans as the "Traitor Bowl" due to several former Seattle players now playing for the new Nashville team, including the likes of Stevi Schnoor, Dominiqué Malloy, Jade Randle, and K.K. Matheny. The team's inaugural season was a high-performing season for the Knights as the offense scored a league-high of 268 points over the four-game regular season, while the defense allowed the second-lowest number of points by opponents. As the top seed in the Eastern Conference Championship game, the Knights had their first loss when they fell to the Chicago Bliss, who would eventually win the Legends Cup two weeks later.

==== Schedule ====
Date	Opponent	Location	Result	Record
April 21	vs. Austin Acoustic	Municipal Auditorium	Won, 51–26	1–0
May 19	at Seattle Mist	ShoWare Center	Won, 43–24	2–0
June 23	vs. Denver Dream	Municipal Auditorium	Won, 94–20	3–0
July 7	at Omaha Heart	Ralston Arena	Won, 80–0	4–0
Eastern Conference Championship
August 25	vs. Chicago Bliss	Toyota Park	Lost, 6–18	4–1

=== 2019 season ===
Open tryouts were held at Boost Fit Club in Nashville on December 8, 2018 in preparation for the 2019 season. The Knights 2019 schedule basically mirrors that of last year, except in reverse, but instead of Seattle, the schedule includes a rematch of the 2018 Eastern Conference Championship game against the Chicago Bliss. Yuri Howard was named new head coach for this season, with Danika Brace now serving as assistant coach and defensive coordinator.

==== Schedule ====
Date	Opponent	Location	Result	Record
June 1	at Omaha Heart	Ralston Arena	Lost, 25–49	0–1
June 22	vs. Denver Dream	Nashville Municipal Auditorium	Won, 14–12	1–1
July 20	at Chicago Bliss	Sears Centre Arena	Won, 8–6	2–1
August 10	vs. Austin Acoustic	Nashville Municipal Auditorium	Lost, 18–20	2–2
