= Austin Peay Governors men's basketball statistical leaders =

The Austin Peay Governors basketball statistical leaders are individual statistical leaders of the Austin Peay Governors basketball program in various categories, including points, rebounds, assists, steals, and blocks. Within those areas, the lists identify single-game, single-season, and career leaders. The Governors represent Austin Peay State University in the NCAA Division I Atlantic Sun Conference (ASUN).

Austin Peay began competing in intercollegiate basketball in 1929. However, the school's record book does not generally list records from before the 1950s, as records from before this period are often incomplete and inconsistent. Since scoring was much lower in this era, and teams played much fewer games during a typical season, it is likely that few or no players from this era would appear on these lists anyway.

The NCAA did not officially record assists as a stat until the 1983–84 season, and blocks and steals until the 1985–86 season, but Austin Peay's record books includes players in these stats before these seasons. These lists are updated through the end of the 2020–21 season.

== Scoring ==
Career
Rk	Player	Points	Seasons
1	Terry Taylor	2507	2017–18 2018–19 2019–20 2020–21
2	Bubba Wells	2267	1993–94 1994–95 1995–96 1996–97
3	Nick Stapleton	2073	1998–99 1999–00 2000–01 2001–02
4	Drake Reed	1991	2005–06 2006–07 2007–08 2008–09
5	Tom Morgan	1850	1952–53 1955–56 1956–57 1957–58
6	Chris Horton	1719	2012–13 2013–14 2014–15 2015–16
7	Otis Howard	1718	1974–75 1975–76 1976–77 1977–78
8	Howard Wright	1700	1967–68 1968–69 1969–70
	Wes Channels	1700	2006–07 2007–08 2008–09 2009–10
10	Anthony Davis	1645	2001–02 2002–03 2003–04 2004–05

Season
Rk	Player	Points	Season
1	James "Fly" Williams	854	1972–73
2	Bubba Wells	789	1995–96
3	Nick Stapleton	742	2001–02
4	Drake Reed	723	2008–09
5	Terry Taylor	718	2019–20
6	Lawrence Mitchell	702	1986–87
7	Trenton Hassell	693	2000–01
8	James "Fly" Williams	687	1973–74
9	Chris Horton	676	2015–16
10	Terry Taylor	675	2018–19

Single game
Rk	Player	Points	Season	Opponent
1	James "Fly" Williams	51	1972–73	Tennessee Tech
	James "Fly" Williams	51	1972–73	Georgia Southern

== Rebounds ==
Career
Rk	Player	Rebounds	Seasons
1	Tom Morgan	1431	1952–53 1955–56 1956–57 1957–58
2	Chris Horton	1261	2012–13 2013–14 2014–15 2015–16
3	Terry Taylor	1248	2017–18 2018–19 2019–20 2020–21
4	Otis Howard	973	1974–75 1975–76 1976–77 1977–78
5	Drake Reed	794	2005–06 2006–07 2007–08 2008–09
6	Reggie Crenshaw	780	1994–95 1995–96 1996–97 1997–98
7	Tommy Brown	765	1988–89 1989–90 1990–91
	John Fraley	765	2008–09 2009–10 2010–11 2011–12
9	Ralph Garner	757	1973–74 1974–75 1975–76 1976–77
10	Josh Lewis	748	2000–01 2001–02 2002–03 2003–04

Season
Rk	Player	Rebounds	Season
1	Tom Morgan	561	1956–57
2	Chris Horton	431	2015–16
3	Terry Taylor	362	2019–20
4	Tommy Brown	346	1990–91
5	Howard Jackson	335	1972–73
6	Chris Horton	333	2014–15
7	Greg Kinman	327	1970–71
8	Terry Taylor	301	2020–21
9	Terry Taylor	294	2018–19
10	Terry Taylor	291	2017–18

Single game
Rk	Player	Rebounds	Season	Opponent
1	Greg Kinman	28	1970–71	Chattanooga

== Assists ==
Career
Rk	Player	Assists	Seasons
1	Norman Jackson	637	1974–75 1975–76 1976–77 1977–78
2	Colby Pierce	593	1993–94 1994–95 1995–96 1996–97
3	Derek Wright	467	2004–05 2005–06 2006–07 2007–08
4	Carlos Paez	428	2019–20 2020–21 2021–22 2022–23
5	Caleb Brown	391	2007–08 2008–09 2009–10 2010–11
6	Trenton Hassell	375	1997–98 1998–99 1999–00 2000–01
7	Greg Franklin	358	1989–90 1990–91 1991–92 1992–93
8	Nick Stapleton	337	1998–99 1999–00 2000–01 2001–02
9	Wes Channels	312	2006–07 2007–08 2008–09 2009–10
10	Anthony Davis	286	2001–02 2002–03 2003–04 2004–05

Season
Rk	Player	Assists	Season
1	Norman Jackson	211	1976–77
2	Colby Pierce	205	1995–96
3	Norman Jackson	204	1977–78
4	Colby Pierce	196	1996–97
5	Danny Odums	173	1972–73
6	Derek Wright	165	2007–08
7	Caleb Brown	161	2010–11
8	Michael Shunick	144	1979–80
	Trenton Hassell	144	2000–01
10	Damarius Smith	139	2013–14

Single game
Rk	Player	Assists	Season	Opponent
1	Norman Jackson	16	1975–76	Southern Miss

== Steals ==
Career
Rk	Player	Steals	Seasons
1	Derek Wright	228	2004–05 2005–06 2006–07 2007–08
2	Colby Pierce	195	1993–94 1994–95 1995–96 1996–97
3	Anthony Davis	193	2001–02 2002–03 2003–04 2004–05
4	Lamonte Ware	180	1987–88 1988–89 1990–91 1991–92
5	Donald Tivis	179	1988–89 1989–90 1990–91
6	Reggie Crenshaw	165	1994–95 1995–96 1996–97 1997–98
7	Wes Channels	164	2006–07 2007–08 2008–09 2009–10
8	Maurice Hampton	160	2002–03 2003–04 2004–05 2005–06
9	Caleb Brown	139	2007–08 2008–09 2009–10 2010–11
	Bubba Wells	139	1993–94 1994–95 1995–96 1996–97

Season
Rk	Player	Steals	Season
1	Derek Wright	89	2007–08
2	Lamonte Ware	71	1988–89
3	Derek Wright	69	2006–07
	Donald Tivis	69	1990–91
5	Zyree Collins	66	2025–26
6	Maurice Hampton	63	2004–05
7	Reggie Crenshaw	62	1997–98
8	Josh Terry	61	2011–12
9	Donald Tivis	60	1988–89
	Josh Terry	60	2010–11
	Colby Pierce	60	1995–96
	Tyshwan Edmondson	60	2010–11

Single game
Rk	Player	Steals	Season	Opponent
1	Reggie Crenshaw	9	1997–98	Tennessee Tech

== Blocks ==
Career
Rk	Player	Blocks	Seasons
1	Chris Horton	325	2012–13 2013–14 2014–15 2015–16
2	Josh Lewis	257	2000–01 2001–02 2002–03 2003–04
3	Reggie Crenshaw	163	1994–95 1995–96 1996–97 1997–98
4	Terry Taylor	132	2017–18 2018–19 2019–20 2020–21
5	John Fraley	130	2008–09 2009–10 2010–11 2011–12
6	Adrian Henning	105	2000–01 2001–02 2002–03 2003–04
7	Lamonte Ware	102	1987–88 1988–89 1990–91 1991–92
	Joe Williams	102	1999–00 2000–01
9	Bubba Wells	96	1993–94 1994–95 1995–96 1996–97
10	Zac Schlader	79	2002–03 2003–04 2004–05 2005–06

Season
Rk	Player	Blocks	Season
1	Chris Horton	100	2012–13
2	Chris Horton	92	2013–14
3	Josh Lewis	83	2003–04
4	Josh Lewis	82	2002–03
5	Chris Horton	70	2014–15
6	Josh Lewis	66	2001–02
7	Chris Horton	63	2015–16
8	John Fraley	55	2010–11
9	Joe Williams	53	2000–01
10	Reggie Crenshaw	51	1997–98

Single game
Rk	Player	Blocks	Season	Opponent
1	Chris Horton	10	2014–15	Berea
2	Chris Horton	8	2013–14	UT Martin
3	John Fraley	7	2010–11	Southeast Missouri
	Chris Horton	7	2012–13	UT Martin
	Chris Horton	7	2012–13	SIU-Edwardsville
	Chris Horton	7	2012–13	SIU-Edwardsville
	Chris Horton	7	2012–13	UT Martin
	Chris Horton	7	2013–14	Southern Illinois
