= London Parris =

American singer (1931–1992)

- Born: Conley Parris; May 25, 1931; United States
- Died: September 7, 1992 (aged 61) United States
- Genres: Southern gospel
- Occupation: Musician
- Instrument: Vocals
- Years active: ca. 1950–1992
- Labels: RCA, Skylite

Conley "London" Parris (May 25, 1931 – September 7, 1992) was an American southern gospel bass singer, famous for his associations with The Rebels quartet and The Blackwood Brothers and hit songs such as "Heaven Came Down". He was inducted into the Southern Gospel Hall of Fame in 2004.

== Biography and career ==
Conley Parris was born on May 25, 1931, in the United States. Named “London” by Lee Roy Abernathy of The Homeland Harmony Quartet, he started singing gospel music in The Rebels Quartet when he replaced bass singer Big Jim Waits.

Parris joined Christian music pioneers The Blackwood Brothers in the late 1960s during their post-Sumner era. With The Blackwood Brothers he released many albums and went on to win two Grammy Awards for Best Gospel Performance with their album In Gospel Country in 1969 at the 12th Annual Grammy Awards and again in 1972 for L-O-V-E at the 15th Annual Grammy Awards, the 1970 Album of the Year award for Fill My Cup, Lord at the 2nd GMA Dove Awards, and many other awards.

In 1971 he started his own group, London Parris and The Apostles, which won the Dove Award for the Most Promising New Gospel Talent at the 4th GMA Dove Awards in 1972.

Parris and his wife Yvonne had two sons, Christopher and David, and one daughter, Kathy. He died on 7 September 1992.

Parris was a consummate performer with a deep bass voice . He became famous for his renditions of "At the Crossing" and "Little Boy Lost", but "Heaven Came Down" and "Everybody Ought to Know" are his signature songs.

In 2004, he was posthumously inducted into the Southern Gospel Hall of Fame, operated at Dollywood, in Pigeon Forge, Tennessee, by the Southern Gospel Music Association.

== Discography ==
As London Parris

Year	Album	Record label
1965	God Called Me to Sing	Skylite / 6038

As London Parris & the Goss Brothers

Year	Album	Record label
1968	Heaven Came Down	Zondervan / 728
1969	Sounds of London	Zondervan / 747

With The Blackwood Brothers Quartet

Year	Album	Record label
1968	Yours Faithfully	RCA Victor
1968	In Gospel Country	RCA Victor
1968	All Day Singing	Skylite
1969	The Heavenly Harmony of The Blackwood Brothers Quartet	
1969	Fill My Cup Lord	RCA Victor
1969	Just a Closer Walk with Thee	RCA Camden
1969	O Come All Ye Faithful	
1970	Gospel Classics	
1970	My God and I	
1970	Oh Happy Day	RCA Camden
1971	Sheltered in the Arms of God	RCA Camden
1971	Amazing Grace	RCA Camden
1971	Put Your Hand in the Hand	RCA Camden
1971	The Blackwood Brothers Quartet featuring London Parris	
1971	He's Still the King of Kings and Lord of Lords	RCA Victor
1972	L-O-V-E	RCA Victor

As London Parris and the Apostles

Year	Album	Record label
1970	What a Day	CAM 1206
1971	The Eastern Gate	
1973	Because He Lives	Chime Records / LP 311
1973	Featuring their Bass, London Parris	QCA / LP 312
1973	Why Me?	QCA / LP 309

With Jackie Marshall

Year	Album	Record label
1987	Friends Working Together	

== See also ==
- The Blackwood Brothers discography
