= 2022 X League season =

- Sport: Indoor American football
- Duration: June 10 – September 10
- Games: 2 per team (scheduled)
- Teams: 8
- Season MVP: Jessica Salazar (RB, Atlanta)

X Cup
- Date: September 10, 2022
- Venue: H-E-B Center, Cedar Park, Texas
- Champions: Chicago Blitz
- Runners-up: Atlanta Empire
- Game MVP: Jade Austin (S, Chicago)

Seasons
- 2019 LFL 2025 LFL

The 2022 X League season was the inaugural season of the Extreme Football League (commonly known as the X League) in the United States. It began in June and concluded in September with the Chicago Blitz winning the inaugural "X Cup" championship game. The league had most recently operated in 2019, branded as the Legends Football League (LFL).

== Season summary ==
The inaugural X-League season was shortened, with each team's regular season reduced from four games to two. The truncated season kicked off on June 10, with a match between the Chicago Blitz and Kansas City Force. Preferring a matchup between two capable teams instead of a one-sided contest between a more-established team (the Blitz succeeded the Chicago Bliss, four-time LFL champions) and a team of rookies (the Force were created after the Nashville Knights were suspended from the league), the league decided to replace the Force roster with coaches and players from the Atlanta Empire; Chicago won and Kansas City was assessed the loss while Atlanta personnel returned to the Empire.

However, the next two matchups weren't as evenly matched. The Los Angeles Black Storm (formerly the Los Angeles Temptations) played the Austin Sound (formerly the Austin Acoustics) and lost, 19–50. The seemingly one-sided matchup was much like the next game against the Denver Rush (formerly the Denver Dream, a rookie team that has started over every season and played in only 4 season of the LFL and only 3 seasons back to back) and the Seattle Thunder (formerly the Seattle Mist and three-time LFL Champions). Denver lost to Seattle, 84–26. Denver played the more-established Atlanta Empire next in their two-game season and lost, 0-28.

The Arizona Red Devils, another new team in the league, suspended operations in June without playing any games. Their scheduled contest against Kansas City was canceled, and a squad from Mexico took their place in a contest against the Los Angeles Black Storm; Los Angeles won, 48–8, in the final game of the regular season on August 13.

The season saw two major upsets as the Empire defeated the top-ranked Austin Sound on July 9, 50–34, and the Chicago Blitz upset the Seattle Thunder (successors to the 2019 LFL champion Seattle Mist) on August 6, 34–28.

=== Postseason ===
The playoffs saw Atlanta (2–0) seeded first, Chicago (2–0) second, Seattle (1–1) third, and Austin (1–1) fourth; point differential was used as a tie-breaker. On August 27, Atlanta survived Austin, 34–32, while Chicago held off Seattle, 34–33. The season concluded on September 10 with the newly restructured league's first-ever "X Cup" ending in a 19–12 victory for the Chicago Blitz over the Atlanta Empire.

== Schedule ==
=== Regular season ===
Week	Date	Visitor	Score	Home	Venue	Ref.
1	Friday, June 10	Chicago Blitz	40–34 (OT)	Kansas City Force	Cable Dahmer Arena, Independence, Missouri	
2	Saturday, June 18	Los Angeles Black Storm	19–50	Austin Sound	H-E-B Center, Cedar Park, Texas	
3	Saturday, June 25	Denver Rush	26–84	Seattle Thunder	accesso ShoWare Center, Kent, Washington	
4	Saturday, July 9	Austin Sound	34–50	Atlanta Empire	Gas South Arena, Duluth, Georgia	
5	Friday, July 15	Kansas City Force	N/C	Arizona Red Devils	Bell Bank Park, Mesa, Arizona	
6	Friday, July 22	Atlanta Empire	28–0	Denver Rush	Budweiser Events Center, Loveland, Colorado	
7	Saturday, July 30	Bye Week				
8	Saturday, August 6	Seattle Thunder	28–34	Chicago Blitz	BMO Harris Bank Center, Rockford, Illinois	
9	Saturday, August 13	Mexico National All-Stars	8–48	Los Angeles Black Storm	Championship Soccer Stadium, Irvine, California	

Notes:

- In week 1, Kansas City was represented by players from the Atlanta Empire.
- In week 9, Arizona was originally scheduled to face Los Angeles.

=== Standings ===
At completion of the regular season

Rank	Team	Record (Win pct.)	PF	PA	Diff.
1†	Atlanta Empire	2–0 (1.000)	78	34	+44
2†	Chicago Blitz	2–0 (1.000)	74	62	+12
3†	Seattle Thunder	1–1 (.500)	112	60	+52
4†	Austin Sound	1–1 (.500)	84	69	+15
5	Los Angeles Black Storm	1–1 (.500)	67	58	+9
6	Arizona Red Devils	0–0 (–)	0	0	0
7	Kansas City Force	0–1 (.000)	34	40	-6
8	Denver Rush	0–2 (.000)	26	112	-86

† Team qualified for postseason

=== Post-season ===
Round	Date	Lower seed	Score	Higher seed	Venue	Ref.
Semi-final	Saturday, August 27	(No. 3) Seattle Thunder	33–34	(No. 2) Chicago Blitz	accesso ShoWare Center, Kent, Washington	
Semi-final	Saturday, August 27	(No. 4) Austin Sound	32–34	(No. 1) Atlanta Empire	accesso ShoWare Center, Kent, Washington	
Final	Saturday, September 10	(No. 2) Chicago Blitz	19–12	(No. 1) Atlanta Empire	H-E-B Center, Cedar Park, Texas	

X Cup 2022

Quarter	1	2	3	4	Total
Chicago Blitz	0	13	0	6	19
Atlanta Empire	6	0	0	6	12

at H-E-B Center • Cedar Park, Texas

- Date: Saturday, September 10, 2022
- Game time: 8:00 p.m. EST
- Recap
  MVP: Jade Austin (S, Chicago)

Game information

First quarter

- ATL – Jessica Salazar 4-yard touchdown run; conversion failed. Atlanta 6–0

Second quarter

- CHI – Stephanie Raymond 1-yard touchdown run; conversion good. Chicago 7–6
- CHI – Tamika Robinson 15-yard touchdown reception from Stephanie Raymond; conversion failed. Chicago 13–6

Third quarter

- No scoring

Fourth quarter

- CHI – Stephanie Raymond 4-yard touchdown run; conversion failed. Chicago 19–6
- ATL – Lindsey Ezell 11-yard touchdown reception from Bailey Hodgins; conversion failed. Chicago 19–12
