= Danika Brace =

American football player and coach

Danika Brace Johnson is an American former football coach and player. She served as the coach and general manager of the Nashville Knights franchise of the Legends Football League (LFL) for the 2018 and 2019 seasons.

Brace became the first coach of the Knights when the LFL announced the establishment of operations of that franchise were established in December 2017.

== Playing career ==
Brace played the game at middle linebacker on defense and tight end on offense. The 2010–11 season saw her initial debut with the Seattle Mist, where she played for her first two seasons. She was recruited to compete for LFL Canada franchise Regina Rage for the proposed 2013 season in that league, but that season was never played. Instead, after graduating from the University of Washington in 2013, she moved to the now-folded Las Vegas Sin, where she helped re-establish that franchise, and competed for that team for two seasons. After supposedly retiring from the game at the end of the 2014 season just before the Sin folded, she returned to the Seattle Mist for the remainder of her playing career from 2015 through the 2017 season, including three appearances in the Legends Cup, two of which the Mist won.

=== Awards ===
In the 2013 season, while playing for the Sin, Brace was named the LFL Defensive Player of the Year. Two seasons later with the Mist, Brace was named League MVP and LFL 2015 defensive player of the year.

== Coaching career ==
By being named the coach of the Nashville Knights when that franchise was established, Brace became the first-ever female coach in the history of the LFL. Her first season as coach resulted in a 4–0 record during the franchise's inaugural 2018 regular season and an appearance in the Eastern Conference final.

== Coaching record ==
Team	Year	Regular season					Postseason			
Team	Year	Wins	Losses	Ties	Win %	Finish	Wins	Losses	Win %	Result
NSH	2018	4	0	0	1.000	1st in Eastern Conference	0	1	0.000	—
NSH	2019	2	2	0	.500	3rd in Eastern Conference	0	0	0.000	—
Total		6	2	0	.750		0	1	0.000	

== Personal life ==
A Seattle native, Brace attended Inglemoor High School in Kenmore, Washington. After graduating high school, she attended college at the University of Washington. She is married to Austin Johnson, defensive lineman for the Jacksonville Jaguars.
