= Just a Closer Walk with Thee (disambiguation) =

"Just a Closer Walk with Thee" is a traditional gospel song.

Just a Closer Walk with Thee may also refer to:

- Just a Closer Walk with Thee (album), an album by Patti Page, 1960
- Just a Closer Walk with Thee, an album by The Blackwood Brothers, 1969
- Just a Closer Walk with Thee, an album by The Blind Boys of Alabama, 2006
- Just a Closer Walk with Thee, an album by Leroy Van Dyke, 1969
