= 1996 Ohio Valley Conference men's basketball tournament =

- Classification: Division I
- Season: 1995–96
- Teams: 7
- Site: Nashville Municipal Auditorium; Nashville, Tennessee
- Champions: Austin Peay (2nd title)
- Winning coach: Dave Loos (1st title)
- MVP: Bubba Wells (Austin Peay)

1995–96 Ohio Valley Conference men's basketball standings
	Conf.				Overall
Team	W		L	PCT	W		L	PCT
Murray State	12	–	4	.750	19	–	10	.655
Tennessee State	11	–	5	.688	15	–	13	.536
Austin Peay †	10	–	6	.625	19	–	11	.633
Middle Tennessee	9	–	7	.563	15	–	12	.556
UT Martin	9	–	7	.563	13	–	14	.481
Tennessee Tech	7	–	9	.438	13	–	15	.464
Eastern Kentucky	7	–	9	.438	13	–	14	.481
Southeast Missouri State	5	–	11	.313	8	–	19	.296
Morehead State	2	–	14	.125	7	–	20	.259
† 1996 OVC tournament winner Rankings from AP Poll

The 1996 Ohio Valley Conference men's basketball tournament was the final event of the 1995–96 season in the Ohio Valley Conference. The tournament was held February 29-March 2, 1996, at Nashville Municipal Auditorium in Nashville, Tennessee.

Austin Peay defeated Murray State in the championship game, 70–68, to win their second OVC men's basketball tournament.

The Governors received an automatic bid to the 1996 NCAA tournament as the No. 14 seed in the Southeast region.

== Format ==
Seven of the nine conference members participated in the tournament field. They were seeded based on regular season conference records, with the top seed (Murray State) receiving a bye to the semifinal round. The teams were re-seeded after the opening round. Southeast Missouri State and UT Martin did not participate.

== Bracket ==
Quarterfinals; Tuesday, February 29
4	Middle Tennessee	69
5	Tennessee Tech	89
(Pairings are reseeded after the first round)
3	Austin Peay	89
6	Eastern Kentucky	67
2	Tennessee State	71
7	Morehead State	60

Semifinals; Wednesday, March 1
1	Murray State	85
5	Tennessee Tech	71
3	Austin Peay	83
2	Tennessee State	62

Championship; Thursday, March 2
1	Murray State	68
3	Austin Peay	70
