= 2008 Ohio Valley Conference men's basketball tournament =

- Classification: Division I
- Season: 2007–08
- Teams: 8
- First round site: campus sites
- Semifinals site: Nashville Municipal Auditorium; Nashville, Tennessee
- Finals site: Nashville Municipal Auditorium; Nashville, Tennessee
- Champions: Austin Peay (4th title)
- Winning coach: Dave Loos (3rd title)
- MVP: Todd Babington (Austin Peay)

2007–08 Ohio Valley Conference men's basketball standings
	Conf.				Overall
Team	W		L	PCT	W		L	PCT
Austin Peay †	16	–	4	.800	24	–	11	.686
Murray State	13	–	7	.650	18	–	13	.581
Morehead State	12	–	8	.600	15	–	15	.500
UT Martin	11	–	9	.550	17	–	16	.515
Samford	10	–	10	.500	14	–	16	.467
Tennessee State	10	–	10	.500	15	–	17	.469
Tennessee Tech	10	–	10	.500	13	–	19	.406
Eastern Kentucky	10	–	10	.500	14	–	16	.467
Eastern Illinois	6	–	14	.300	7	–	22	.241
Jacksonville State	5	–	15	.250	7	–	22	.241
Southeast Missouri State	7	–	13	.350	12	–	19	.387
† 2008 OVC tournament winner Rankings from AP Poll

The 2008 Ohio Valley Conference men's basketball tournament took place March 4–8, 2008. The first round was hosted by the better seed in each game. The semifinals and finals took place at Nashville Municipal Auditorium in Nashville, Tennessee. Austin Peay won the tournament advanced to the NCAA tournament.

== Format ==
The top eight eligible men's basketball teams in the Ohio Valley Conference receive a berth in the conference tournament. After the 20 game conference season, teams are seeded by conference record.

== Bracket ==
Quarterfinals; March 4
1	Austin Peay	76
8	Eastern Kentucky	51
4	UT Martin	101
5	Samford	94^{3OT}
3	Morehead State	61
6	Tennessee State	68
2	Murray State	77
7	Tennessee Tech	74

Semifinals; March 7
1	Austin Peay	78
4	UT Martin	77
6	Tennessee State	83
2	Murray State	75

Finals; March 8
1	Austin Peay	82
6	Tennessee State	64

== Sources ==
- Field Set for 2008 OVC Men's Basketball Tournament
- CBS Sportsline
