= 1995–96 Austin Peay Governors basketball team =

American college basketball season

1995–96 Austin Peay Governors basketball

Ohio Valley Tournament champions

NCAA tournament, first round
- Conference: Ohio Valley Conference
- West Division
- Record: 19–11 (10–6 OVC)
- Head coach: Dave Loos (6th season)
- Assistant coaches: Jay Bowen; Kevin Hogan; Julian Terrell
- Home arena: Dunn Center

1995–96 Ohio Valley Conference men's basketball standings
	Conf.				Overall
Team	W		L	PCT	W		L	PCT
Murray State	12	–	4	.750	19	–	10	.655
Tennessee State	11	–	5	.688	15	–	13	.536
Austin Peay †	10	–	6	.625	19	–	11	.633
Middle Tennessee	9	–	7	.563	15	–	12	.556
UT Martin	9	–	7	.563	13	–	14	.481
Tennessee Tech	7	–	9	.438	13	–	15	.464
Eastern Kentucky	7	–	9	.438	13	–	14	.481
Southeast Missouri State	5	–	11	.313	8	–	19	.296
Morehead State	2	–	14	.125	7	–	20	.259
† 1996 OVC tournament winner Rankings from AP Poll

The 1995–96 Austin Peay Governors basketball team represented Austin Peay State University during the 1995–96 NCAA Division I men's basketball season. The Governors, led by 6th year head coach Dave Loos, played their home games at the Dunn Center and were members of the West Division of the Ohio Valley Conference. They finished the season 19–11, 10–6 in OVC play. They won the OVC tournament to earn the conference's automatic bid to the NCAA tournament. As the No. 14 seed in the Southeast region, they lost to No. 3 seed Georgia Tech in the first round.

== Roster ==
1995–96 Austin Peay Governors men's basketball team
Players	Coaches
Pos. / # / Name / Height / Weight / Year / Previous school / Hometown; F / 13 / Bubba Wells / 6 ft 5 in (1.96 m) / 220 lb (100 kg) / Jr / Russellville, Kentucky	Head coach: Dave Loos (Memphis); Assistant coach(es) Legend: (C) Team captain; (S) Suspended; (I) Ineligible; (W) Walk-on; Injured; Current redshirt; Roster; Last update: February 26, 2023

== Schedule and results ==
Date time, TV	Rank^{#}	Opponent^{#}	Result	Record	Site (attendance) city, state
Regular season
Dec 18, 1995*		at No. 15 Missouri	L 58–81	3–3	Hearnes Center; Columbia, Missouri
Dec 20, 1995*		at Southern Illinois	W 78–65	4–3	SIU Arena; Carbondale, Illinois
Ohio Valley Conference tournament
Feb 29, 1996*		vs. Eastern Kentucky; Quarterfinals	W 89–67	17–10	Nashville Municipal Auditorium; Nashville, Tennessee
Mar 1, 1996*		at Tennessee State; Semifinals	W 83–62	18–10	Nashville Municipal Auditorium; Nashville, Tennessee
Mar 2, 1996*		vs. Murray State; Championship game	W 70–68	19–10	Nashville Municipal Auditorium; Nashville, Tennessee
NCAA tournament
Mar 15, 1996*	(14 SE)	vs. (3 SE) No. 13 Georgia Tech; First round	L 79–90	19–11	Orlando Arena; Orlando, Florida
*Non-conference game. ^{#}Rankings from AP Poll. (#) Tournament seedings in parentheses. SE=Southeast. All times are in Central Time.
