= Dave Loos =

American basketball coach

Biographical details
- Born: March 5, 1947 (age 79); St. Louis, Missouri, U.S.

Playing career
- 1966–1969: Memphis State
- Position: Point guard

Coaching career (HC unless noted)
- 1969–1970: Memphis State (asst.)
- 1970–1974: Christian Brothers (asst.)
- 1974–1982: Mehlville HS
- 1982–1986: Christian Brothers
- 1986–1990: Memphis State (asst.)
- 1990–2017: Austin Peay

Administrative career (AD unless noted)
- 1997–2013: Austin Peay

Head coaching record
- Overall: 502–463 (.520)

Accomplishments and honors

Championships
- As head coach: 4× OVC tournament (1996, 2003, 2008, 2016); 5× OVC regular season (1997, 2003, 2004, 2007, 2008); VSAC regular season (1985) As assistant coach: Metro tournament (1987)

Awards
- 4× OVC Coach of the Year (1991, 1997, 2003, 2004)

Records
- Winningest head coach in OVC men's basketball history (421 wins)

David Henry Loos (born March 5, 1947) is a retired American college basketball coach who most recently served as head coach of the men's team at Austin Peay State University, where he is also a former athletic director. He was head coach from 1990 until retiring at the end of the 2016–17 season.

On April 2, 2013, Loos announced that he would relinquish his position as director of athletics to focus solely on coaching basketball. Derek van der Merwe was announced as the successor to Loos on June 5, 2013. On March 5, 2016, the Loos-coached Governors won the tournament championship of the Ohio Valley Conference, thus qualifying to participate once again in the NCAA Division I men's basketball tournament.

The following season, which ultimately proved to be his last as head coach, was set against the backdrop of a battle with colorectal cancer. During the 2016 offseason, he underwent surgery to remove the malignancy. A malignant lymph node was found during the procedure, and he began chemotherapy. Loos was forced to take a medical leave in January 2017, missing four games. After the Governors failed to make the 2017 OVC tournament, ending their season, Loos chose to retire. The university announced his decision on March 2, which was followed by a full press conference on March 6.

== Head coaching record ==
Record table
Season	Team	Overall	Conference	Standing	Postseason
Christian Brothers University (Volunteer State Athletic Conference) (1982–1985)
1982–83	Christian Brothers	16–14	8–8	?	NAIA Dist. 1st round
1983–84	Christian Brothers	21–15	9–5	?	NAIA Dist. Final
1984–85	Christian Brothers	25–10	12–2	1st	NAIA Dist. 1st round
Christian Brothers University (Tennessee Collegiate Athletic Conference) (1985–1986)
1985–86	Christian Brothers	20–14	13–5	?	NAIA Dist. 1st round
Christian Brothers:		82–53	42–20		
Austin Peay Governors (Ohio Valley Conference) (1990–2017)
1990–91	Austin Peay	15–14	6–6	T–3rd	
1991–92	Austin Peay	11–17	6–8	T–5th	
1992–93	Austin Peay	7–20	4–12	T–8th	
1993–94	Austin Peay	11–16	10–6	3rd	
1994–95	Austin Peay	13–16	8–8	5th	
1995–96	Austin Peay	19–11	10–6	3rd	NCAA first round
1996–97	Austin Peay	17–14	12–6	T–1st	
1997–98	Austin Peay	17–11	11–7	4th	
1998–99	Austin Peay	11–16	9–9	T–3rd	
1999–00	Austin Peay	18–10	11–7	T–3rd	
2000–01	Austin Peay	22–10	10–6	4th	
2001–02	Austin Peay	14–18	8–8	4th	
2002–03	Austin Peay	23–8	13–3	T–1st	NCAA first round
2003–04	Austin Peay	22–10	16–0	1st	NIT Second Round
2004–05	Austin Peay	13–19	9–7	T–5th	
2005–06	Austin Peay	17–14	11–9	T–5th	
2006–07	Austin Peay	21–12	16–4	1st	NIT First Round
2007–08	Austin Peay	24–11	16–4	1st	NCAA first round
2008–09	Austin Peay	19–14	13–5	2nd	CIT First Round
2009–10	Austin Peay	17–15	11–7	3rd	
2010–11	Austin Peay	20–14	13–5	2nd	CBI First Round
2011–12	Austin Peay	12–20	8–8	6th	
2012–13	Austin Peay	8–23	4–12	6th (West)	
2013–14	Austin Peay	12–18	6–10	5th (West)	
2014–15	Austin Peay	8–22	3–13	6th (West)	
2015–16	Austin Peay	18–18	7–9	4th (West)	NCAA first round
2016–17	Austin Peay	11–19	7–9	4th (West)	
Austin Peay:		420–410 (.506)	258–194 (.571)		
Total:		502–463 (.520)			
National champion Postseason invitational champion Conference regular season champion Conference regular season and conference tournament champion Division regular season champion Division regular season and conference tournament champion Conference tournament champion
