= 3rd GMA Dove Awards =

Cancelled 1971 US music awards ceremony

- Date: October 9, 1971
- Location: Nashville Municipal Auditorium, Nashville, Tennessee

The 3rd Annual GMA Dove Awards moved to Nashville, Tennessee. The award ceremony was on held October 9, 1971, at the Nashville Municipal Auditorium after two years in Memphis. As a result of the voting irregularities controversy, most awards were nullified.

== Controversy ==
As the Gospel Music Association was still in its infancy, during the 1970 National Quartet Convention, managers for artists were contacted by the GMA in order to have artists join the organization.

Shortly after the 1971 Dove Awards, J. D. Sumner (Stamps Quartet) and Paul Downing (of the family group) led a charge that voting irregularities had occurred, as Cecil and James Blackwood of the Blackwood Brothers signed friends as members and influenced GMA voting by suggesting these new members who then had voting rights to vote for the Blackwoods in categories they were eligible, or other suggested candidates in categories the Blackwoods were ineligible. The Blackwoods admitted to signing friends, but the group charging irregularities claimed the voting could have been rigged.

The Gospel Music Association declared the 1971 ceremony null and void later in the week.

Although technically within the rules, questions of fair play were raised. James Blackwood, leader of the Blackwoods, apologized. The rules were then changed so that such a thing would not happen again.

Some winners on the original evening have refused to surrender their awards, even though the GMA nullified the entire year.

== Nullified ==
NOTE: This was from the 1971 Dove Awards program before it was nullified.

- Instrumentalist: Billy Blackwood and Marty Glisson
- Album Photo Artwork: My God and I (Blackwood Brothers, RCA Records)
- Graphic Layout: Amazing Grace (Blackwood Brothers, RCA Camden Records)
- Back Liner Notes: My God and I (Blackwood Brothers, RCA Records)
- Television Program: Johnny Cash Hour
- Gospel Disc Jockey: Sid Hughes
- Songwriter of the Year: Bill Gaither
- Song of the Year: "The King Is Coming," Bill Gaither, Gloria Gaither
- Female Vocalist of the Year: Sue Chenault
  - Chenault has refused to return the award to the GMA; she would legitimately win the next three consecutive awards in this category. One of the questionable artists in question, Donna Blackwood of the Blackwood Singers, was also nominated.
- Male Vocalist of the Year: James Blackwood
  - Had this incident not taken place, Blackwood would have eight Male Vocalist of the Year awards, which would be one more than Steven Curtis Chapman, who has tied Blackwood at seven.
- Album of the Year: My God and I (Blackwood Brothers, RCA Records)
- Most Promising New Talent (currently New Artist of the Year): Kay Blackwood and Marty Glisson
- Mixed Group: The Blackwood Singers
  - The GMA's decision nullified what would have been the only win by the family in this award.

== Hall of Fame ==
The GMA Music Hall of Fame debuted in 1971, and G.T. "Dad" Speer and "Pappy" Jim Waites were named to the inaugural Hall of Fame class. These inductees did not have their awards revoked.
