= 2003 Ohio Valley Conference men's basketball tournament =

- Classification: Division I
- Season: 2002–03
- Teams: 8
- First round site: Campus Sites
- Semifinals site: Gaylord Entertainment Center; Nashville, Tennessee
- Finals site: Gaylord Entertainment Center; Nashville, Tennessee
- Champions: Austin Peay (3rd title)
- Winning coach: Dave Loos (2nd title)
- MVP: Josh Lewis (Austin Peay)

2002–03 Ohio Valley Conference men's basketball standings
	Conf.				Overall
Team	W		L	PCT	W		L	PCT
Austin Peay †	13	–	3	.813	23	–	8	.742
Morehead State	13	–	3	.813	20	–	9	.690
Tennessee Tech	11	–	5	.688	20	–	12	.625
Murray State	9	–	7	.563	17	–	12	.586
Eastern Illinois	9	–	7	.563	14	–	15	.483
UT Martin	7	–	9	.438	14	–	14	.500
Southeast Missouri State	5	–	11	.313	11	–	19	.367
Eastern Kentucky	5	–	11	.313	11	–	17	.393
Tennessee State	0	–	16	.000	2	–	25	.074
† 2003 OVC tournament winner Rankings from AP Poll

The 2003 Ohio Valley Conference men's basketball tournament was the postseason men's basketball tournament of the Ohio Valley Conference during the 2002–03 NCAA Division I men's basketball season. It was held March 4–8, 2003. The first round was hosted by the higher seeded team in each game. The semifinals and finals took place at Gaylord Entertainment Center in Nashville, Tennessee.

Top-seeded Austin Peay won the tournament, defeating Tennessee Tech in the championship game, and received the Ohio Valley's automatic bid to the NCAA tournament. Josh Lewis of Austin Peay was named the tournament's most valuable player.

== Format ==
The top eight eligible men's basketball teams in the Ohio Valley Conference receive a berth in the conference tournament. After the regular season, teams were seeded by conference record.

== Bracket ==
Quarterfinals; March 4
1	Austin Peay	83
8	Eastern Kentucky	80
4	Murray State	74
5	Eastern Illinois	63
3	Tennessee Tech	76
6	UT Martin	62
2	Morehead State	91
7	Southeast Missouri State	84

Semifinals; March 7
1	Austin Peay	59
4	Murray State	58^{OT}
3	Tennessee Tech	88
2	Morehead State	71

Finals; March 8
1	Austin Peay	63
3	Tennessee Tech	57
