= Starrcade '95: World Cup of Wrestling =

1995 World Championship Wrestling pay-per-view event

- Promotional poster featuring Sting and The Great Muta
- Promotion: World Championship Wrestling
- Date: December 27, 1995
- City: Nashville, Tennessee
- Venue: Nashville Municipal Auditorium
- Attendance: 8,200
- Buy rate: 75,000
- Tagline: USA's Toughest Meet Japan's Best In This International Wrestling Showdown...

Pay-per-view chronology
← Previous; World War 3	Next → SuperBrawl VI

Starrcade chronology
← Previous; 1994	Next → 1996

Starrcade '95: World Cup of Wrestling was the 13th annual Starrcade professional wrestling pay-per-view (PPV) event produced by World Championship Wrestling (WCW). It took place on December 27, 1995, at the Nashville Municipal Auditorium in Nashville, Tennessee. The event included a seven match tournament between wrestlers representing WCW and their Japanese partner New Japan Pro-Wrestling (NJPW) billed as the "World Cup of Wrestling", in which Sting (WCW) defeated Kensuke Sasaki (NJPW) in the finals; WCW won the tournament four points to three. Ric Flair defeated Randy Savage in the main event for the WCW World Heavyweight Championship.

WCW closed in 2001 and all rights to their television and pay-per-view shows were bought by WWE, including the Starrcade series.

== Event ==
Other on-screen personnel
Role:	Name:
Commentators	Tony Schiavone
Commentators	Bobby Heenan
Commentators	Dusty Rhodes
Interviewer	Gene Okerlund
Ring announcers	Michael Buffer
Ring announcers	David Penzer
Referees	Randy Anderson
Referees	Randy Eller
Referees	Nick Patrick

WCW won the "World Cup of Wrestling", four points to three as Sting defeated New Japan Pro-Wrestling (NJPW) representative Kensuke Sasaki in the seventh and final match of the tournament.

At the event Ric Flair also defeated Lex Luger and Sting by count-out in a Triangle match to earn an immediate title match against WCW World Heavyweight Champion Randy Savage in the main event. Flair defeated Savage for the championship.

After the main event WCW held one additional match, taping it for a later broadcast. The match saw WCW United States Champion Kensuke Sasaki wrestle against The One Man Gang. At the end of the match the 400-plus pound One Man Gang landed a splash on Sasaki and covered him for the pinfall. While Sasaki kicked out of the pinfall, referee Randy Eller still made the three-count to give victory to the One Man Gang. After the bell rang the One Man Gang celebrated with the title belt. Moments later however, the mistake was pointed out by another official, and the match was restarted. Sasaki then pinned Gang to retain the title. Parts of the match were later shown on WCW Saturday Night but they ended after One Man Gang was declared the new champion. WCW never acknowledged that the match was restarted, choosing to recognize the One Man Gang as champion instead.

== Reception ==
Lance Augustine of TJRWrestling gave the event a rating of 6.75/10, stating, "I thought this was a really well put together show that showcased a lot of WCW talent at the time. The Benoit and Guerrero matches were top-notch and it was cool to see them beginning their ascent through the business. Most of the other tournament matches were solid as well with Luger, Savage, Sting, and Flair being super over on the night and really had their moments where the crowd was into all of them. The Triangle Match could have been way shorter and while I didn’t like taking the title off Savage so quickly, losing it to Flair isn’t a bad thing. Hogan being off the show was a bit odd too, but he was kayfabe suspended because he was probably shooting a movie or something. I thought the show was a definite step up from the last couple of outings, and it will be fun to dive into the next year."

== Results ==
No.	Results	Stipulations	Times
1^{D}	Diamond Dallas Page defeated Dave Sullivan	Singles match	—
2^{D}	The American Males (Marcus Alexander Bagwell and Scotty Riggs) defeated The Blue Bloods (Lord Steven Regal and Earl Robert Eaton)	Tag team match	—
3	Jushin Thunder Liger (NJPW) (with Sonny Onoo) defeated Chris Benoit (WCW)	Singles match	10:29
4	Koji Kanemoto (NJPW) (with Sonny Onoo) defeated Alex Wright (WCW)	Singles match	11:44
5	Lex Luger (WCW) (with Jimmy Hart) defeated Masahiro Chono (NJPW) (with Sonny Onoo)	Singles match	06:41
6	Johnny B. Badd (WCW) (with The Diamond Doll) defeated Masa Saito (NJPW) (with Sonny Onoo) by disqualification	Singles match	05:52
7	Shinjiro Otani (NJPW) (with Sonny Onoo) defeated Eddy Guerrero (WCW)	Singles match	13:43
8	Randy Savage (WCW) defeated Hiroyoshi Tenzan (NJPW) (with Sonny Onoo)	Singles match	06:55
9	Sting (WCW) defeated Kensuke Sasaki (NJPW) (with Sonny Onoo)	Singles match	06:52
10	Ric Flair defeated Sting and Lex Luger	Triangle match	28:03
11	Ric Flair (with Jimmy Hart) defeated Randy Savage (c)	Singles match for the WCW World Heavyweight Championship	08:41
12^{D}	One Man Gang defeated Kensuke Sasaki (c)	Singles match for the WCW United States Heavyweight Championship	—
(c) / – the champion(s) heading into the match; D / – this was a dark match
