= Denver Rush =

American women's gridiron football team

Logo

General information
- Founded: 2020 (franchise); 2022 (competition)
- Stadium: Blue Arena
- Headquartered: Loveland, Colorado
- Colors: Neon Aqua, Black
- Website: xleague.live/denver-rush/

Personnel
- Head coach: Jim Cobb

League / conference affiliations
- X League

The Denver Rush are a women's American football team in the Extreme Football League (X League) based in Loveland, Colorado, a suburb of Denver.

== History ==
The Extreme Football League (X League) was announced in December 2019, as a successor to the Legends Football League (LFL). The announcement included the Rush, a successor to the LFL's Denver Dream. The X League's 2020 season was postponed, and the league also did not operate during 2021, amid the COVID-19 pandemic.

The Rush first competed during the 2022 X League season; they lost both of their regular season games, to the Seattle Thunder and Atlanta Empire, and did not advance to the postseason.
