= Starrcade '94: Triple Threat =

1994 World Championship Wrestling pay-per-view event

- Promotional poster featuring Hulk Hogan, Big Van Vader and Sting
- Promotion: World Championship Wrestling
- Date: December 27, 1994
- City: Nashville, Tennessee
- Venue: Nashville Municipal Auditorium
- Attendance: 8,200
- Buy rate: 130,000
- Tagline: It's A Triple Threat!

Pay-per-view chronology
← Previous; AAA When Worlds Collide	Next → SuperBrawl V

Starrcade chronology
← Previous; 1993	Next → 1995

Starrcade '94: Triple Threat was the 12th annual Starrcade professional wrestling pay-per-view (PPV) event produced by World Championship Wrestling (WCW). It took place on December 27, 1994, from the Nashville Municipal Auditorium in Nashville, Tennessee. The main event of the show was WCW World Heavyweight Champion Hulk Hogan defending the title against his friend-turned-rival The Butcher. The show also included Jim Duggan defending the WCW United States Championship against Big Van Vader and Johnny B. Badd defending the WCW World Television Championship against Arn Anderson.

Aspersions were cast on the inclusion of The Butcher (Ed Leslie) in the main event, which was seen as a political maneuver on the part of Hulk Hogan (Leslie's real-life best friend). The match was received negatively by industry journalists, with Wade Keller calling it "one of the low points of WCW".

WCW closed in 2001, and all rights to their television and pay-per-view shows – including the Starrcade series – were bought by WWE.

== Event ==
Other on-screen personnel
Role:	Name:
Commentators	Tony Schiavone
Commentators	Bobby Heenan
Interviewer	Gene Okerlund
Ring announcer	Gary Michael Cappetta
Referees	Randy Anderson
Referees	Nick Patrick
Referees	Jimmy Jett

The Honky Tonk Man was originally advertised for the show, scheduled to challenge Johnny B. Badd for the WCW World Television Championship, but hours prior to the start of the event, he was fired by WCW's Eric Bischoff for refusing to put over Johnny after learning that he was to lose to him during their planned match. Instead WCW chose Arn Anderson to replace the Honky Tonk Man, wrestling and losing to Johnny. At the time of the show, Harlem Heat had won the WCW World Tag Team Championship prior to the event, but the match had not been broadcast on television yet so Harlem Heat were not presented as the champions. This would be the last appearance in WCW of Jean-Paul Levesque as he would depart from the company and join the WWF in 1995, becoming Hunter Hearst Helmsley, whose gimmick was that of a snobby aristocrat character.

== Reception ==
The involvement of The Butcher (Ed Leslie) in the main event of WCW's flagship pay-per-view garnered particular criticism. Stuart Carapola of PWInsider wrote that "Starrcade 1994 saw [Hulk] Hogan defend the WCW World Title against his best friend [Leslie], who leapfrogged over everyone else in WCW despite being badly out of shape and greatly diminished from the wrestler he was." Wade Keller reported that Leslie's main event positioning was viewed as the result of Hogan making "a political move to help a buddy, not doing what was best for business". Keller called the match "awful", "one of the low points of WCW", and a "sharp turn away" from the "good pay-per-view main events" that the company was then known for presenting, while noting that Leslie "wasn't over".

Dave Meltzer awarded the Hogan vs. Butcher match ¾ of a star out of a possible five: no match on the card received a rating higher than 2¼ stars. In reviewing the event, Scott Keith of 411Mania wrote: "Welcome to rock bottom, as Hogan's egomania results in the main event of the biggest WCW show of the year involving [Ed Leslie]." He cautioned viewers to watch at their "own risk", while offering the "strongest recommendation to avoid."

== Results ==
No.	Results	Stipulations	Times
1	Vader (with Harley Race) defeated Jim Duggan (c)	Singles match for the WCW United States Heavyweight Championship	12:06
2	Alex Wright defeated Jean Paul Levesque	Singles match	14:03
3	Johnny B. Badd (c) defeated Arn Anderson (with Col. Robert Parker and Meng)	Singles match for the WCW World Television Championship	12:11
4	The Nasty Boys (Brian Knobbs and Jerry Sags) defeated Harlem Heat (Booker T and Stevie Ray) (with Sister Sherri) by disqualification	Tag team match	17:49
5	Mr. T defeated Kevin Sullivan	Singles match	03:50
6	Sting defeated John Tenta by disqualification	Singles match	15:26
7	Hulk Hogan (c) (with Jimmy Hart) defeated The Butcher	Singles match for the WCW World Heavyweight Championship	12:07
(c) / – the champion(s) heading into the match

== See also ==
- List of WCW pay-per-view events
