= Dallas Sound =

American women's gridiron football team

Logo

General information
- Founded: 2020 (franchise); 2022 (competition)
- Stadium: H-E-B Center (2022); TBA (2024–present)
- Headquartered: Dallas, Texas
- Colors: Red, White, Navy Blue: Austin Sound (2022); Dallas Sound (2024–Present)
- Website: xleague.live/austin-sound/

Personnel
- Head coach: Mike Olvera

League / conference affiliations
- X League

The Dallas Sound are a women's American football team in the Extreme Football League (X League) based in Dallas, Texas.

Austin Sound logo for the 2022 season.

== History ==
The Extreme Football League (X League) was announced in December 2019, as a successor to the Legends Football League (LFL). The announcement included the Austin Sound, a successor to the LFL's Austin Acoustic. The X League's 2020 season was postponed, and the league also did not operate during 2021, amid the COVID-19 pandemic.

The Sound first competed during the 2022 X League season, defeating the Los Angeles Black Storm and losing to the Atlanta Empire during the regular season. The Sound advanced to the postseason, where they again lost to Atlanta, ending their season.

On October 10, 2024, the X League officially announced the Austin Sound would move to Dallas, Texas for the 2025 season.
