= Austin Johnson (defensive lineman) =

American football player (born 1994)

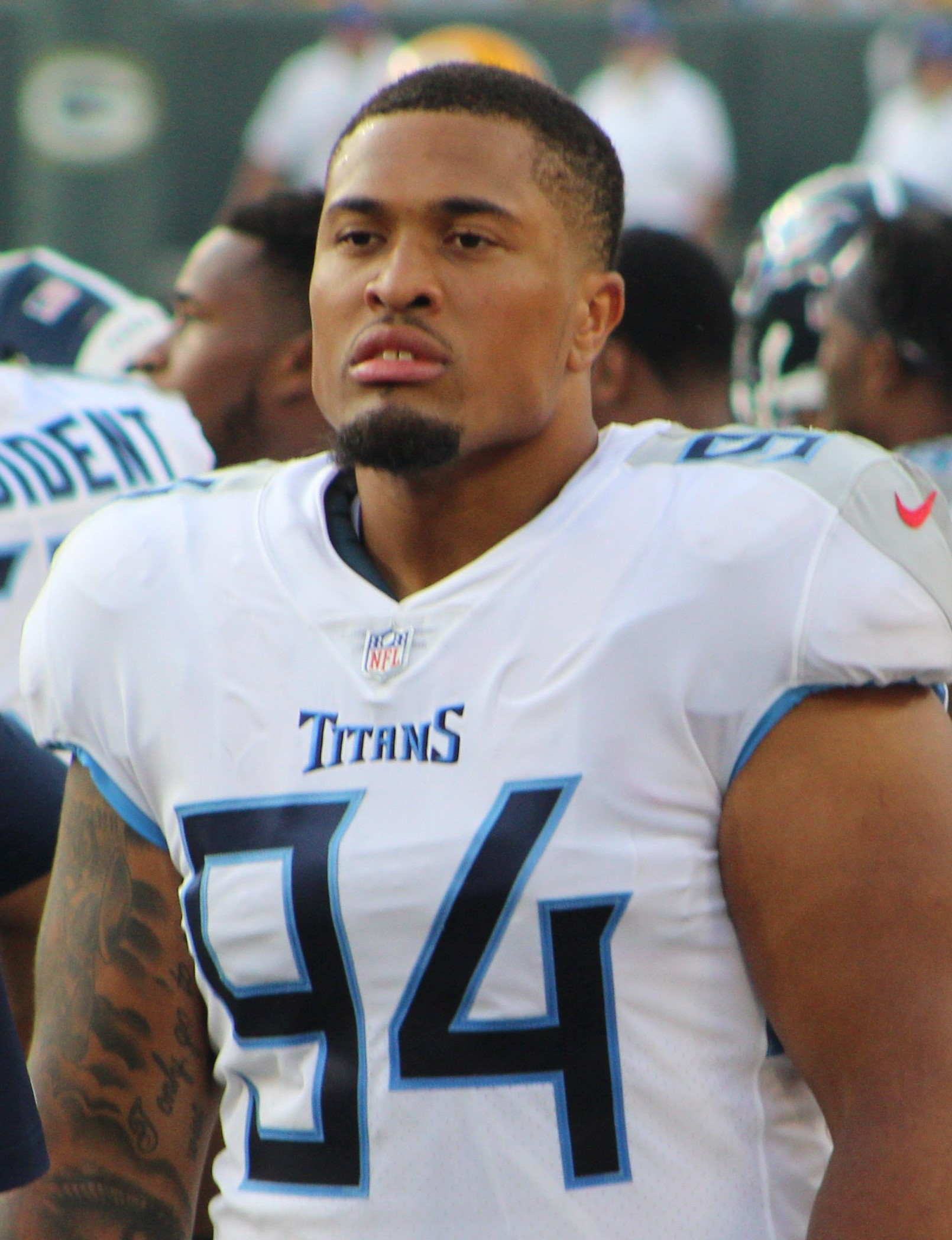
- Johnson with the Tennessee Titans in 2018

No. 55 – Jacksonville Jaguars
- Position: Defensive tackle
- Roster status: Practice squad

Personal information
- Born: May 8, 1994 (age 32); Galloway, New Jersey, U.S.
- Listed height: 6 ft 4 in (1.93 m)
- Listed weight: 314 lb (142 kg)

Career information
- High school: St. Augustine Prep (Richland, New Jersey)
- College: Penn State (2012–2015)
- NFL draft: 2016: 2nd round, 43rd overall pick

Career history
- Tennessee Titans (2016–2019); New York Giants (2020–2021); Los Angeles Chargers (2022–2023); Buffalo Bills (2024); Jacksonville Jaguars (2025); Buffalo Bills (2026)*; Jacksonville Jaguars (2026–present)*
- * Offseason or practice squad member only

Awards and highlights
- Second-team All-Big Ten (2015)

Career NFL statistics as of 2025
- Total tackles: 272
- Sacks: 9.5
- Forced fumbles: 3
- Fumble recoveries: 2
- Pass deflections: 13
- Stats at Pro Football Reference

Austin Hunter Johnson (born May 8, 1994) is an American professional football defensive tackle for the Jacksonville Jaguars of the National Football League (NFL). He played college football for the Penn State Nittany Lions, and was drafted by the Tennessee Titans in the second round of the 2016 NFL draft. Johnson has also played for the New York Giants, Los Angeles Chargers, and Buffalo Bills.

== Early life ==
Johnson was born in Galloway Township, New Jersey to parents Austin and Tammy Johnson, the third of four children – he has two older sisters and one younger sister. Johnson attended St. Augustine Preparatory School in Richland, New Jersey with plans to play basketball in hopes of someday playing in college. He played basketball and earned all-state accolades as a senior. However, the football coach convinced Johnson to try out for the football team, and he did. Subsequently, Johnson was recruited by Penn State defensive line coach Larry Johnson, who convinced him not only to commit to Penn State, but to keep his commitment after crippling sanctions were announced in wake of the Penn State child sex abuse scandal, as well as the arrival of new coach Bill O'Brien.

== College career ==
"An unheralded prep player from New Jersey who spent as much time on the basketball court as the football field," Johnson redshirted his freshman season, but entered training camp in 2013 eager to make an impact on the defensive line, establishing himself as a candidate to start opposite DaQuan Jones, Penn State's star defensive tackle that season. Mentored by Larry Johnson, Jones, and Jordan Hill, Austin Johnson proved himself early in the season, and earned a spot in the rotation at defensive tackle with Jones and Kyle Baublitz. At the end of the 2013 season, Johnson was named a member of the freshman all-conference teams by both ESPN.com, and the Big Ten Network.

Entering his redshirt sophomore season firmly established on the defensive line along with converted defensive end Anthony Zettel, Johnson sought to "lead by example". Penn State defensive coordinator Bob Shoop asserted that he was a consummate Penn State defensive tackle, drawing comparisons to Jones and Jack Crawford, among others. The Patriot News columnist Bob Flounders rated Johnson among the most important components to Penn State's team entering the 2014 season. Early in the season, he did not compile many defensive statistics, but Penn State coach James Franklin commented, "[Johnson is] probably the most athletic 315-pound guy I've been around. The thing I like the most about him is every time I see him when he walks in the building or he's out at practice, he's got a huge smile on his face," going onto note that Johnson had the ability to "wreck" an opponent's game. Four games into Penn State's season, they had the best rush defense in the country, which Franklin attributed largely to the efforts of Johnson.

Johnson majored in business administration at Penn State.

== Professional career ==
=== Pre-draft ===
Coming out of Penn State, most scouts and analysts projected Johnson to be a second round pick. He was invited to the NFL Combine and was able to complete all the drills and positional workouts. Scouts and representatives from 31 NFL teams attended Penn State's pro day to evaluate Johnson, Christian Hackenberg, Jordan Lucas, Anthony Zettel, Carl Nassib, and eight other prospects. He chose to only perform positional drills, and Johnson was ranked the ninth best defensive tackle by NFLDraftScout.com and ranked the 14th best defensive tackle (80th overall) by Sports Illustrated.

Pre-draft measurables
Height	Weight	Arm length	Hand span	40-yard dash	10-yard split	20-yard split	20-yard shuttle	Three-cone drill	Vertical jump	Broad jump	Bench press	Wonderlic
6 ft 4 3/8 in (1.94 m)	314 lb (142 kg)	32 3/4 in (0.83 m)	9 7/8 in (0.25 m)	5.32 s	1.86 s	3.07 s	4.75 s	7.84 s	26 in (0.66 m)	8 ft 3 in (2.51 m)	25 reps	34
All values from NFL Combine

=== Tennessee Titans ===
The Tennessee Titans selected Johnson in the second round (43rd overall) of the 2016 NFL draft. He was the sixth defensive tackle selected and the first of five Penn State players drafted.

On May 9, 2016, the Titans signed Johnson to a four-year, $5.66 million contract with $3.02 million guaranteed and a signing bonus of $2.31 million.

Johnson entered training camp competing for the starting nose tackle position with Al Woods and Antwaun Woods. He was named the backup nose tackle to veteran Al Woods to begin the regular season.

Johnson made his NFL debut in the season opener against the Minnesota Vikings and made one tackle in the 25–16 loss. During a Week 11 against the Indianapolis Colts, he made two solo tackles and was credited with half a sack on Andrew Luck in the 24–17 road loss. On December 18, 2016, Johnson made a season-high four combined tackles during a narrow 19–17 road victory over the Kansas City Chiefs.

As a rookie in 2016, Johnson appeared in 10 games and finished with 15 tackles and a half-sack.

In the 2019 season, Johnson appeared in 16 games, starting one. He had 23 total tackles and no sacks for the first time in his career.

=== New York Giants ===
On March 30, 2020, Johnson was signed by the New York Giants.

In Week 4 against the Los Angeles Rams, Johnson recorded his first sack and forced fumble as a Giant during the 17–9 loss.

On March 17, 2021, Johnson re-signed with the Giants. He started all 17 games, recording a career-high 72 tackles and 3.5 sacks.

=== Los Angeles Chargers ===
On March 16, 2022, Johnson signed a two-year, $14 million contract with the Los Angeles Chargers. He suffered a knee injury in Week 9 and was placed on injured reserve on November 9.

Johnson started all 17 games in 2023, recording 46 tackles, two passes defensed, and a forced fumble.

=== Buffalo Bills ===
On March 28, 2024, Johnson signed a one-year contract with the Buffalo Bills. Johnson recorded his first NFL interception on October 27, catching a deflected pass from Geno Smith of the Seattle Seahawks. It was Johnson's first ever interception at any level. Two weeks later, Johnson recorded the second interception of his career against the Indianapolis Colts.

=== Jacksonville Jaguars ===
On August 4, 2025, the Jacksonville Jaguars signed Johnson.

=== Buffalo Bills (second stint) ===
On September 23, 2026, Johnson signed with the Buffalo Bills' practice squad. On October 27, he was released.

=== Jacksonville Jaguars (second stint) ===
On November 2, 2026, Johnson was signed to the Jacksonville Jaguars practice squad.

== Personal life ==
Johnson is married to former Legends Football League football league player Danika Brace.

== NFL statistics ==
=== Regular season ===
Year	Team	Games		Tackling				Fumbles				Interceptions					
Year	Team	GP	GS	Comb	Solo	Ast	Sack	FF	FR	Yds	TD	Int	Yds	Avg	Lng	TD	PD
2016	TEN	10	0	14	7	7	0.5	0	0	0	0	0	0	0.0	0	0	1
2017	TEN	16	3	24	15	9	1.0	0	0	0	0	0	0	0.0	0	0	1
2018	TEN	16	9	22	13	9	1.0	0	0	0	0	0	0	0.0	0	0	2
2019	TEN	16	1	23	11	12	0.0	0	0	0	0	0	0	0.0	0	0	1
2020	NYG	16	0	18	8	10	1.0	1	0	0	0	0	0	0.0	0	0	1
2021	NYG	17	17	72	31	41	3.5	0	1	0	0	0	0	0.0	0	0	1
Career		91	30	173	85	88	7.0	1	1	0	0	0	0	0	0.0	0	7

=== Postseason ===
Year	Team	Games		Tackles				Interceptions						Fumbles			
Year	Team	GP	GS	Comb	Solo	Ast	Sack	Int	Yds	Avg	Lng	TD	PD	FF	FR	Yds	TD
2017	TEN	2	1	4	2	2	0.0	0	0	0.0	0	0	1	0	0	0	0
2019	TEN	3	0	1	1	0	0.0	0	0	0.0	0	0	0	0	0	0	0
Career		5	1	5	3	2	0.0	0	0	0.0	0	0	1	0	0	0	0
