= 2015 LFL US season =

2015 LFL United States
- Duration: April 11, 2015 – August 29, 2015

Legends Cup
- Date: August 29, 2015
- Venue: ShoWare Center Kent, WA
- Champions: Seattle Mist

Seasons
- 2014 US 2015 Australia

The 2015 LFL Season was the sixth season of LFL United States, the third in the rebranded Legends Football League, and the eighth in the combined history of that league and its predecessor, the Lingerie Football League. The season featured six teams in various cities across the United States.

== Developments ==
At the January 27 State of the League address, the League stated that four teams would be suspending operations prior to the 2015 season: Baltimore Charm, Green Bay Chill, Jacksonville Breeze, and Toledo Crush. Green Bay Chill plan on returning from inactivity following a franchise overhaul. Baltimore Charm plan to return for the 2016 season following a relocation to the Washington, D.C. area. Both the Jacksonville Breeze and the Toledo Crush plan to relocate to different cities in their respective states and plan to return sometime in the next few years.

== Teams ==
2015 Teams
Eastern Conference
Atlanta Steam	Arena at Gwinnett Center (Duluth, Georgia)
Chicago Bliss	Toyota Park (Bridgeview, Illinois)
Omaha Heart	Ralston Arena (Omaha, Nebraska)
Western Conference
Las Vegas Sin	Citizens Business Bank Arena (Ontario, California)
Los Angeles Temptation	Los Angeles Memorial Coliseum (Los Angeles, California)
Seattle Mist	ShoWare Center (Kent, Washington)

== Schedule ==
Date	Visitor	Home	Kickoff	Venue	Score	Game Recap
Regular Season
Saturday, April 11	Chicago Bliss	Atlanta Steam	8:00 PM ET	Arena at Gwinnett Center	Chicago Bliss 27; Atlanta Steam 24	Recap
Saturday, April 18	Atlanta Steam	Omaha Heart	8:00 PM CT	Ralston Arena	Atlanta Steam 79; Omaha Heart 0	Recap
Saturday, April 25	Omaha Heart	Chicago Bliss	8:00 PM CT	Toyota Park	Chicago Bliss 49; Omaha Heart 0	Recap
Saturday, May 2	Omaha Heart	Atlanta Steam	8:00 PM ET	Arena at Gwinnett Center	Atlanta Steam 62; Omaha Heart 0	Recap
Sunday, May 10	Atlanta Steam	Chicago Bliss	1:00 PM CT	Toyota Park	Chicago Bliss 29; Atlanta Steam 13	Recap
Saturday, May 16	Las Vegas Sin	Los Angeles Temptation	8:00 PM PT	Los Angeles Memorial Coliseum	Los Angeles Temptation 59; Las Vegas Sin 24	Recap
Saturday, May 23	Bye Week					
Friday, May 29	Los Angeles Temptation	Seattle Mist	8:00 PM PT	ShoWare Center	Los Angeles Temptation 14; Seattle Mist 13	
Saturday, June 6	Seattle Mist	Los Angeles Temptation	8:00 PM PT	Los Angeles Memorial Coliseum	Seattle Mist 27; Los Angeles Temptation 26	
Saturday, June 13	Chicago Bliss	Omaha Heart	8:00 PM CT	Ralston Arena	Chicago Bliss 40; Omaha Heart 0	
Sunday, June 21	Seattle Mist	Las Vegas Sin	1:00 PM PT	Citizens Business Bank Arena	Seattle Mist 34; Las Vegas Sin 26	
Saturday, June 20	Las Vegas Sin	Los Angeles Temptation	8:00 PM PT	Los Angeles Memorial Coliseum	Cancelled	
Friday, July 3	Los Angeles Temptation	Seattle Mist	8:00 PM PT	ShoWare Center	Seattle Mist 24; Los Angeles Temptation 13	
Friday, July 10	Omaha Heart	Atlanta Steam	8:00 PM ET	Arena at Gwinnett Center	Atlanta Steam 71; Omaha Heart 13	
Saturday, July 18	Bye Week					
Thursday, July 23	Los Angeles Temptation	Las Vegas Sin	8:00 PM PT	Citizens Business Bank Arena	Los Angeles Temptation 28; Las Vegas Sin 14	
Saturday, August 1	Las Vegas Sin	Seattle Mist	8:00 PM PT	ShoWare Center	Seattle Mist 64; Las Vegas Sin 19	
Wednesday, August 5	Seattle Mist	Las Vegas Sin	8:00 PM PT	Citizens Business Bank Arena	Cancelled	
Saturday, August 8	Chicago Bliss	Omaha Heart	8:00 PM CT	Ralston Arena	Chicago Bliss 26; Omaha Heart 0	

== Playoffs ==
Date	Visitor	Home	Kickoff	Venue	City	Score	Game Recap
Conference Championships
Saturday, August 15	Seattle Mist(W1)	Los Angeles Temptation(W2)	5:00 PM CT	Toyota Park	Bridgeview, Illinois	Seattle Mist 28; Los Angeles Temptation 24	
Saturday, August 15	Atlanta Steam(E2)	Chicago Bliss(E1)	8:00 PM CT	Toyota Park	Bridgeview, Illinois	Chicago Bliss 41; Atlanta Steam 6	
Legends Cup
Sunday, August 23	Chicago Bliss(E1)	Seattle Mist(W1)	3:00 PM PT	ShoWare Center	Kent, Washington	Seattle Mist 27; Chicago Bliss 21	

== Standings ==
=== Eastern Conference ===
Team	Wins	Loss	Ties	Pct	PF	PA	Net Pts	TD's	Home Record	Home Pct	Road Record	Road Pct	Streak
^*Chicago Bliss	5	0	0	1.000	171	37	134	25	2-0	1.000	3-0	1.000	L1
*Atlanta Steam	3	2	0	0.600	249	69	145	38	2-1	0.667	1-1	0.500	L1
Omaha Heart	0	6	0	0.000	13	327	-314	2	0-3	0.000	0-3	0.000	L6

=== Western Conference ===
Team	Wins	Loss	Ties	Pct	PF	PA	Net Pts	TD's	Home Record	Home Pct	Road Record	Road Pct	Streak
^*Seattle Mist	4	1	1	0.667	162	98	64	24	2-1	0.667	2-0	1.000	W6
*Los Angeles Temptation	3	2	1	0.500	130	102	28	21	1-1	0.500	2-1	0.667	L1
Las Vegas Sin	0	4	2	0.000	83	185	-102	13	0-2	0.000	0-2	0.000	L4

*clinched playoff berth, ^conference champion

== Legends Cup 2015 ==
The undefeated, two-time champion Chicago Bliss faced off against the Seattle Mist who were making their first appearance in the Legends Cup. Seattle took an early lead and built it throughout the first half, going into the break with a 20-0 lead. Seattle added to their lead in the third quarter to go up 27-0 before Chicago began a rally. The Bliss scored at the end of the third quarter and added two more touchdowns in the fourth quarter but fell short of victory as Seattle won its first Legends Cup title 27-21.

== Awards ==
League MVP

- Danika Brace - Seattle Mist
- Dakota Hughes - Atlanta Steam
- K.K Matheny - Seattle Mist
- Lauran Ziegler - Atlanta Steam

Offensive Player of the Year

- Chrisdell Harris - Chicago Bliss
- Dakota Hughes - Atlanta Steam
- Stevi Schnoor - Seattle Mist
- Lauran Ziegler - Atlanta Steam

Defensive Player of the Year

- Alli Alberts - Chicago Bliss
- Danika Brace - Seattle Mist
- Leanne Hardin - Atlanta Steam
- Adrian Purnell - Atlanta Steam

Rookie of the Year

- Kimm Chase - Los Angeles Temptation
- Kadi Findling - Seattle Mist
- Jesse Locklear - Atlanta Steam
- Dominique Malloy - Las Vegas Sin

In The Trenches

- Kimm Chase - Los Angeles Temptation
- Meghan Hanson - Seattle Mist
- Yashi Rice - Chicago Bliss
- Dina Wojowski - Atlanta Steam

Mortaza Award

- Monique Gaxiola - Los Angeles Temptation
- Danielle Harvey - Los Angeles Temptation
- Amanda Hogan - Omaha Heart
- Lauran Ziegler - Atlanta Steam

Coach of the Year

- David Bizub / Tui Suiaunoa - Los Angeles Temptation
- Keith Hac - Chicago Bliss
- Chris Michaelson - Seattle Mist
- Dane Robinson - Atlanta Steam

Team of the Year

- Atlanta Steam
- Chicago Bliss
- Los Angeles Temptation
- Seattle Mist

8th Man Award (Best Fan Base)

- Atlanta Steam
- Chicago Bliss
- Omaha Heart
- Seattle Mist

2015 LFL Hall of Fame Induction - Liz Gorman

- 2009-2012 Tampa Breeze
- 2013–Present Los Angeles Temptation
- 2010, 2011 Defensive Player of the Year (Tampa Breeze)
- 2010, 2011 Eastern Conference All-Fantasy Team (Tampa Breeze)
