= 2nd GMA Dove Awards =

1970 US music awards ceremony

- Date: 1970
- Location: Memphis, Tennessee

The 2nd Annual GMA Dove Awards were held in 1970. They recognized accomplishment of musicians for the year 1969.

== Award winners ==
- Song Of The Year
  - "The Night Before Easter"; Don Sumner, Dwayne Friend; Gospel Qt Music (SESAC)
- Songwriter Of The Year
  - Bill Gaither
- Male Vocalist Of The Year
  - James Blackwood
- Female Vocalist Of The Year
  - Ann Downing
- Male Group Of The Year
  - Oak Ridge Boys
- Mixed Group Of The Year
  - The Speer Family
- Most Promising New Gospel Talent
  - Four Gallileans
- Album of the Year
  - Fill My Cup, Lord; The Blackwood Brothers; Darol Rice; RCA Victor
- Instrumentalist
  - Dwayne Friend
- Backliner Notes
  - Mrs. Jake Hess; Ain't That Beautiful Singin'; Jake Hess
- Cover Photo or Cover Art
  - Bill Grine; This Is My Valley; The Rambos
- Graphic Layout And Design
  - Jerry Goff; Thrasher Brothers at Fantastic Caverns; The Thrasher Brothers
- Television Program
  - Gospel Jubilee, Florida Boys
- D.J. of the Year
  - J. G. Whitfield
