= Arizona Red Devils =

American women's gridiron football team

Logo

General information
- Founded: 2020 (franchise)
- Folded: 2022
- Stadium: Bell Bank Park
- Headquartered: Mesa, Arizona
- Colors: Neon Red, Black
- Website: xleague.live/arizona-red-devils/

League / conference affiliations
- X League

The Arizona Red Devils were a women's American football team in the Extreme Football League (X League) based in Mesa, Arizona. Due to season cancellations and issues within the franchise during the league's 2022 season, the team did not compete in the X League.

== History ==
The Extreme Football League (X League) was announced in December 2019, as a successor to the Legends Football League (LFL). The original announcement included a team in Omaha, Nebraska, the Omaha Red Devils, a successor to the LFL's Omaha Heart. The X League's 2020 season was postponed and the Omaha Red Devils never played as the brand was relocated to Arizona for the 2021 season.

Amid the COVID-19 pandemic, the X League again did not operate during 2021. The league did hold its 2022 season, with the Red Devils scheduled to play two games: at home on July 15 against the Kansas City Force, and away on August 13 against the Los Angeles Black Storm. However, in mid-June it was announced that the Red Devils were suspending activities until the 2023 season. The June 15 contest against Kansas City was not played, and an alternate team from Mexico faced Los Angeles on August 13.
