= 2002–03 Austin Peay Governors basketball team =

American college basketball season

2002–03 Austin Peay Governors basketball

Ohio Valley Tournament champions

NCAA tournament, first round
- Conference: Ohio Valley Conference
- West Division
- Record: 23–8 (13–3 OVC)
- Head coach: Dave Loos (13th season)
- Assistant coaches: Jay Bowen; Kevin Hogan; Julian Terrell
- Home arena: Dunn Center

2002–03 Ohio Valley Conference men's basketball standings
	Conf.				Overall
Team	W		L	PCT	W		L	PCT
Austin Peay †	13	–	3	.813	23	–	8	.742
Morehead State	13	–	3	.813	20	–	9	.690
Tennessee Tech	11	–	5	.688	20	–	12	.625
Murray State	9	–	7	.563	17	–	12	.586
Eastern Illinois	9	–	7	.563	14	–	15	.483
UT Martin	7	–	9	.438	14	–	14	.500
Southeast Missouri State	5	–	11	.313	11	–	19	.367
Eastern Kentucky	5	–	11	.313	11	–	17	.393
Tennessee State	0	–	16	.000	2	–	25	.074
† 2003 OVC tournament winner Rankings from AP Poll

The 2002–03 Austin Peay Governors basketball team represented Austin Peay State University during the 2002–03 NCAA Division I men's basketball season. The Governors, led by 13th year head coach Dave Loos, played their home games at the Dunn Center and were members of the West Division of the Ohio Valley Conference. They finished the season 23–8, 13–3 in OVC play. They won the OVC tournament to earn the conference's automatic bid to the NCAA tournament. As the No. 13 seed in the South region, they lost to No. 4 seed Louisville in the first round.

== Roster ==
2002–03 Austin Peay Governors men's basketball team
Players
Coaches

Pos.	#	Name	Height	Weight	Year	Previous school	Hometown
G	3	Corey Gipson	6 ft 1 in (1.85 m)	185 lb (84 kg)	Jr	Three Rivers CC	Sikeston, Missouri
C	4	Zac Schlader	6 ft 9 in (2.06 m)	220 lb (100 kg)	Fr	Hickman HS	Columbia, Missouri
G	10	Levi Carmichael	6 ft 0 in (1.83 m)	165 lb (75 kg)	So	Eastern Greene HS	Bloomfield, Indiana
F	14	Adrian Henning	6 ft 7 in (2.01 m)	205 lb (93 kg)	Jr	Ridgeway HS	Memphis, Tennessee
G	20	Michael Dudas	5 ft 11 in (1.8 m)	160 lb (73 kg)	Fr	Hopkinsville HS	Hopkinsville, Kentucky
G	21	Maurice Hampton	6 ft 2 in (1.88 m)	175 lb (79 kg)	Fr	Russellville HS	Russellville, Kentucky
G	23	Anthony Davis	6 ft 2 in (1.88 m)	205 lb (93 kg)	So	Inglewood HS	Inglewood, California
C	24	Josh Lewis	6 ft 8 in (2.03 m)	220 lb (100 kg)	Jr	Lafayette HS	Lexington, Kentucky
G	32	Rhet Wierzba	6 ft 5 in (1.96 m)	190 lb (86 kg)	Jr	Farmington HS	Farmington, Illinois
C	33	Jermaine Graham	6 ft 9 in (2.06 m)	215 lb (98 kg)	Jr	Hesston CC	Milwaukee, Wisconsin
F	34	Igor Macura	6 ft 7 in (2.01 m)	205 lb (93 kg)	Sr	Zephyrhills HS	Ljublyana, Slovenia
C	54	Bobbye Hill	6 ft 8 in (2.03 m)	245 lb (111 kg)	Sr	Tyler JC	Tyler, Texas

Head coach

- Dave Loos (Memphis)

Assistant coach(es)

Legend

- (C) Team captain
- (S) Suspended
- (I) Ineligible
- (W) Walk-on
- Injured
- Current redshirt

Roster
Last update: February 26, 2023

== Schedule and results ==
Date time, TV	Rank^{#}	Opponent^{#}	Result	Record	Site (attendance) city, state
Regular season
Nov 22, 2002*		at Memphis	W 81–80 ^{OT}	1–0	Pyramid Arena; Memphis, Tennessee
Nov 30, 2002*		at No. 18 Missouri	L 46–81	2–1	Hearnes Center; Columbia, Missouri
Ohio Valley Conference tournament
Mar 7, 2003*		vs. Murray State; Semifinals	W 59–56 ^{OT}	22–7	Bridgestone Arena; Nashville, Tennessee
Mar 8, 2003*		vs. Tennessee Tech; Championship game	W 63–57	23–7	Bridgestone Arena; Nashville, Tennessee
NCAA tournament
Mar 21, 2003*	(13 E)	vs. (4 E) No. 14 Louisville; First round	L 64–86	23–8	BJCC Arena; Birmingham, Alabama
*Non-conference game. ^{#}Rankings from AP Poll. (#) Tournament seedings in parentheses. E=East. All times are in Central Time.
