= Nashville Municipal Auditorium =

Multi-purpose indoor arena in Tennessee, U.S.

- "NMA"

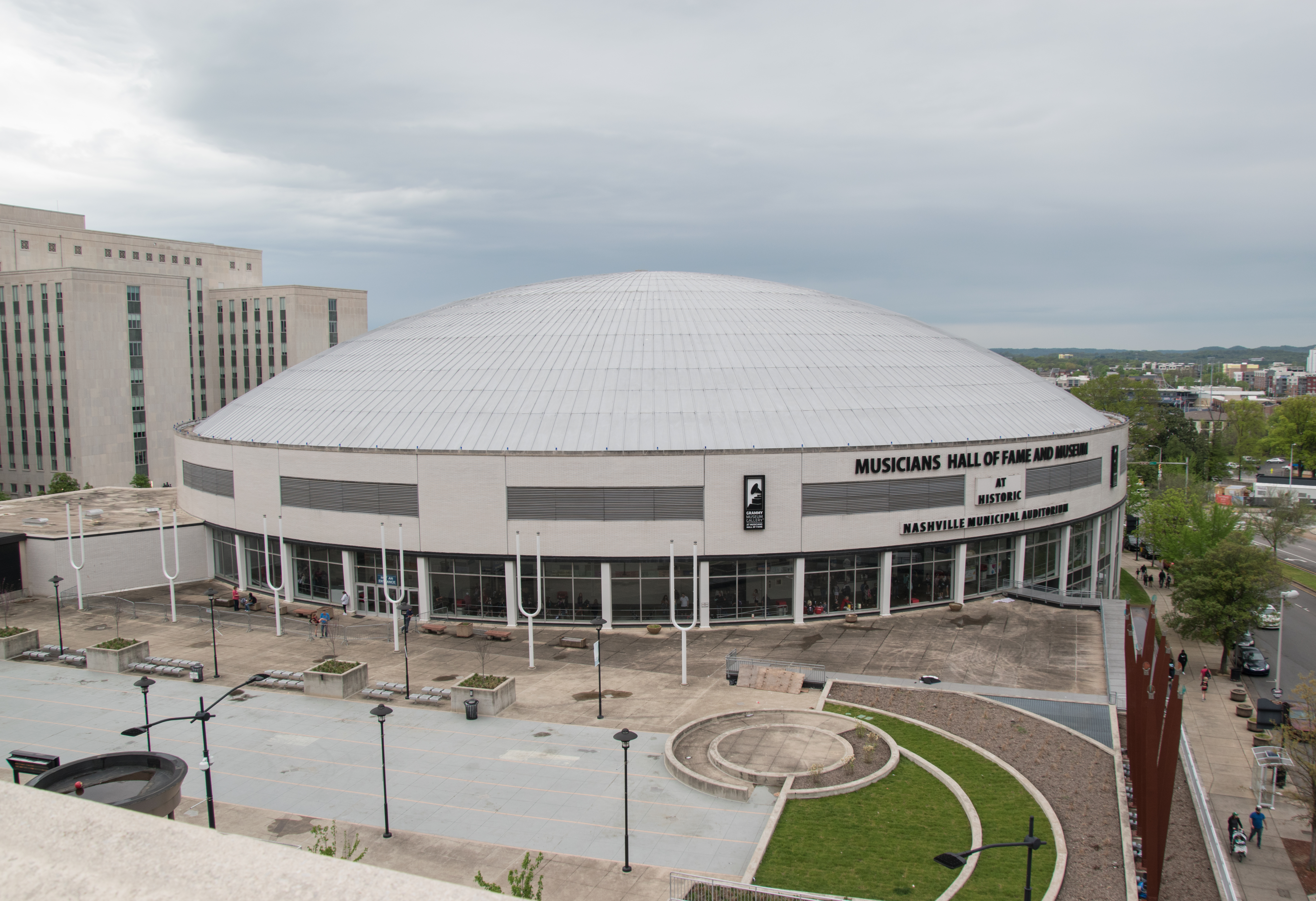
- Interactive map of Nashville Municipal Auditorium
- Address: 417 Fourth Avenue North
- Location: Nashville, Tennessee, U.S.
- Coordinates: 36°10′03.29″N 86°46′56.08″W
- Owner: Metropolitan Government of Nashville & Davidson County, Tennessee
- Operator: Metropolitan Government of Nashville & Davidson County, Tennessee
- Capacity: 9,700 in the round 9,432 in the round (reserved); 8,000 (basketball)
- Surface: Concrete
- Field size: 200,000 sq ft (19,000 m^{2})

Construction
- Groundbreaking: 1959
- Built: 1959–1962
- Opened: October 7, 1962
- Renovated: 1993, 2017
- Cost: US$5 million ($53.2 million in 2025 dollars)
- Architect: Marr & Holman
- Structural engineer: N.J. Olson
- General contractor: Nashville Bridge Company
- Main contractor: Rock City Contracting Co.

Tenants
- Nashville Dixie Flyers (EHL) 1962–1971; Nashville South Stars (CHL/ACHL) 1981–1983; Nashville Knights (ECHL) 1989–1996; Nashville Stars (WBL) 1991; Music City Jammers (GBA) 1991–1992; Nashville Nighthawks/Ice Flyers (CHL) 1996–1998; Nashville Noise (ABL) 1998; Belmont Bruins (NCAA) 2001–2003; Nashville Rollergirls (WFTDA) 2006–2019; Nashville Broncs (ABA) 2008–2009; Nashville Venom (PIFL) 2014–2015; Nashville Knights (LFL) 2018–2019; Nashville Kats (AFL/AF1) 2024–2025

Website
- nashvilleauditorium.com

The Nashville Municipal Auditorium is an indoor sports and concert venue in Nashville, Tennessee. It opened October 7, 1962 with both an arena and exhibition hall. The former exhibition hall has been permanent home to the Musicians Hall of Fame and Museum since 2013.

It was the city's primary indoor sports and concert venue from its opening until 1996, when Bridgestone Arena (then known as Nashville Arena) was constructed a few blocks away. Since that time, it has hosted secondary events and various minor league sports franchises. The venue has hosted major events including the CMA Awards (1967), Volunteer Jam (1976–1985), WrestleWar (1989), No Holds Barred: The Match/The Movie (1989), Starrcade (1994–1996), In Your House (1995), U.S. Figure Skating Championships (1997), SuperBrawl (2001). Slammiversary (2007), Lockdown (2012), CMT Music Awards (2022) and Ric Flair's Last Match (2022).

== History ==
=== Construction ===
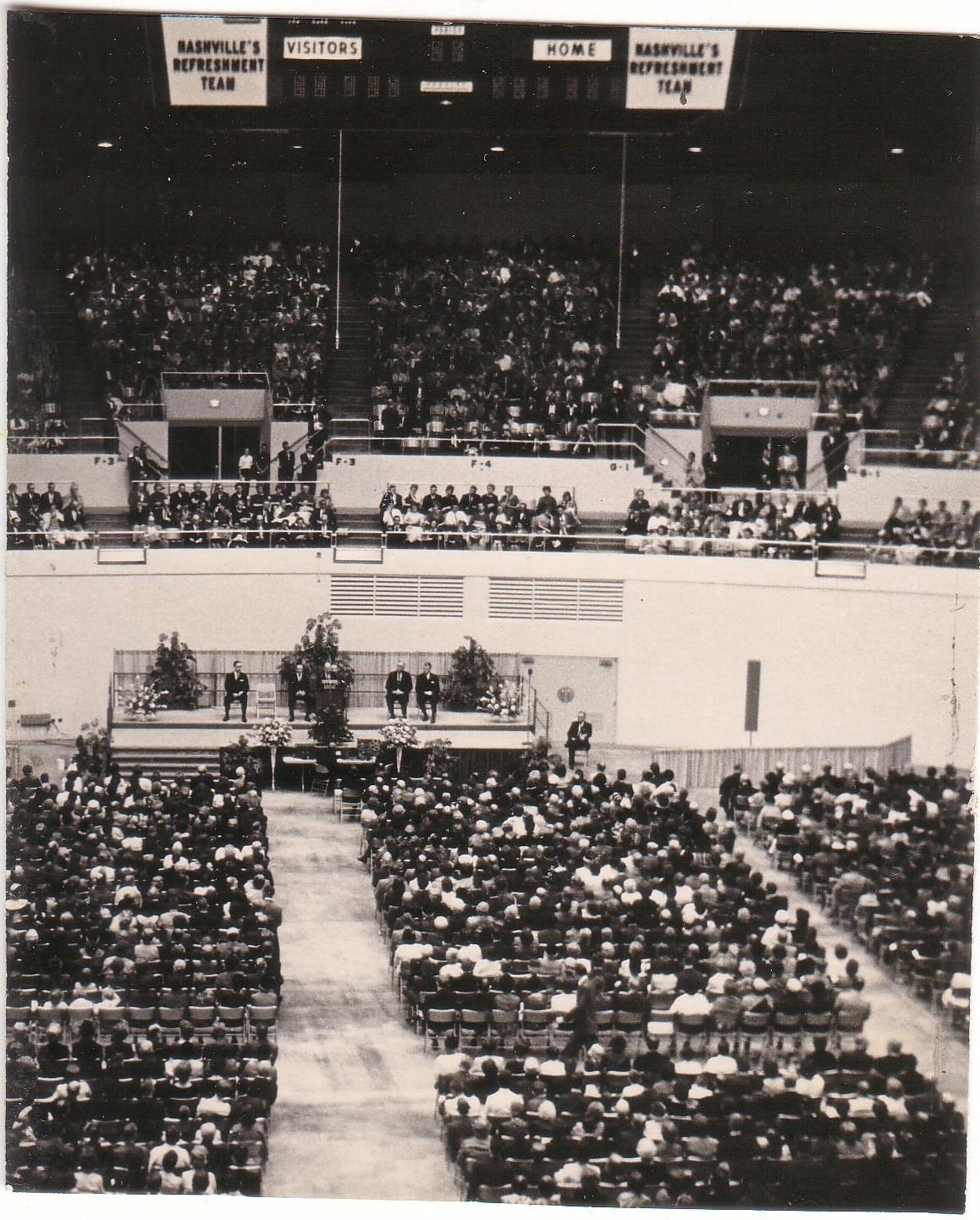
Church of Christ revival on October 7, 1962

Designed by Marr & Holman and constructed by Nashville Bridge Company in 1962 at a cost of $5 million, the venue was the first public assembly hall in the Mid South with air conditioning.

The venue was built on the site of Bijou Amusement Company’s former Bijou Theatre as part of an urban renewal plan. Bijou Theatre was frequented by African American audiences prior to desegregation.

The structure contains a 306-foot diameter bowl with a spherically curved, clear-span roof. Within the facility is an underground exhibition hall and an arena with two tiers of spectator stands.

=== Opening and reception ===
The first event at the venue was a Church of Christ revival on October 7, 1962. The week-long revival from October 7–14 drew more than 90,000 people.

=== Alterations ===
The walls of the upper and lower concourses are decorated with enlarged ticket stubs from events and concerts the venue hosted between 1962 and 2010.

$3.2 million in renovations were completed in 2017 to satisfy venue promoter Live Nation, including modernized seating and dressing room areas.

=== Notable events ===
==== Ice Hockey ====
Despite the auditorium's floor area being too small to fit a regulation North American rink, several minor league ice hockey teams have been based at Municipal Auditorium, including the Nashville Dixie Flyers (EHL, 1962―71), South Stars (CHL, 1981―83), Knights (ECHL, 1989―96), and Nighthawks/Ice Flyers (CHL, 1996―98). The auditorium has not hosted a hockey game since the Nashville Predators were founded in 1998 at Bridgestone Arena.

==== Basketball ====
The venue was home court for the NCAA Belmont Bruins basketball teams from 2001 to 2003 while Striplin Gym was demolished to make way for Curb Event Center.

The venue hosted the Ohio Valley Conference basketball tournament in 1989, 1994, 1995, 1996, 2008, 2011, 2012, 2013, 2014, 2015, 2016 and 2017.

It currently hosts the annual Magnet Madness basketball game between rivals Hume-Fogg High School and Martin Luther King Magnet.

==== Professional wrestling ====
The venue hosted the NWA's inaugural WrestleWar event, WrestleWar '89: Music City Showdown, which featured the Pro Wrestling Illustrated Match of the Year between Ric Flair and Ricky Steamboat.

It hosted WWF's No Holds Barred: The Match/The Movie pay-per-view special in December 1989, WWF's SummerSlam Spectacular broadcast in August 1992, as well as WWF In Your House 2: The Lumberjacks in 1995.

The venue hosted WCW's Starrcade 1994, Starrcade 1995, Starrcade 1996, Clash of the Champions XXXV in 1997, and SuperBrawl Revenge in 2001.

Masato Tanaka won his only ECW Heavyweight Championship by defeating Mike Awesome at the venue during an ECW on TNN taping in December 1999.

Total Nonstop Action Wrestling held their first events at the venue in June 2002 before moving to Tennessee State Fairgrounds. The venue also hosted TNA Wrestling's Slammiversary 2007 and Lockdown 2012.

The venue hosted Ring of Honor Wrestling television tapings between 2016 and 2020, and AEW Dynamite broadcasts between 2019 and 2022.

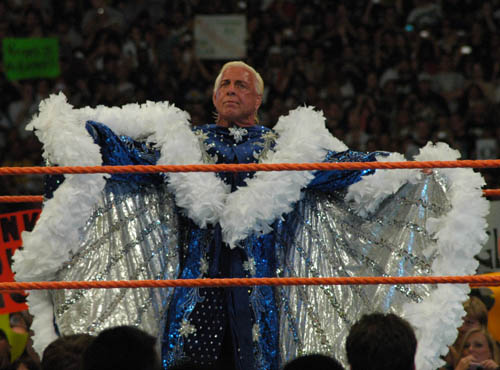
Ric Flair, who headlined events at the venue including WrestleWar '89: Music City Showdown, Starrcade '95: World Cup of Wrestling and Ric Flair's Last Match

Ric Flair's Last Match took place at the venue in July 2022.

==== Other sports ====
The venue hosted the 1994 Coca-Cola National Gymnastics Championships.

The Professional Bull Riders' Bud Light Cup Series held an event at the venue from 1993 through 2001. In 2002, the event was moved to Bridgestone Arena.

The venue hosted the 1997 U.S. Figure Skating Championships.

The venue hosted the Championship Bull Riding All-Star Shootout on June 10, 2009.

Strikeforce Challengers: Woodley vs. Saffiedine took place at the venue on January 7, 2011.

The third incarnation of the Nashville Kats of the AF1 began play at the venue in 2024, but will relocate to F&M Bank Arena in Clarksville, Tennessee for 2026.

==== Concerts ====
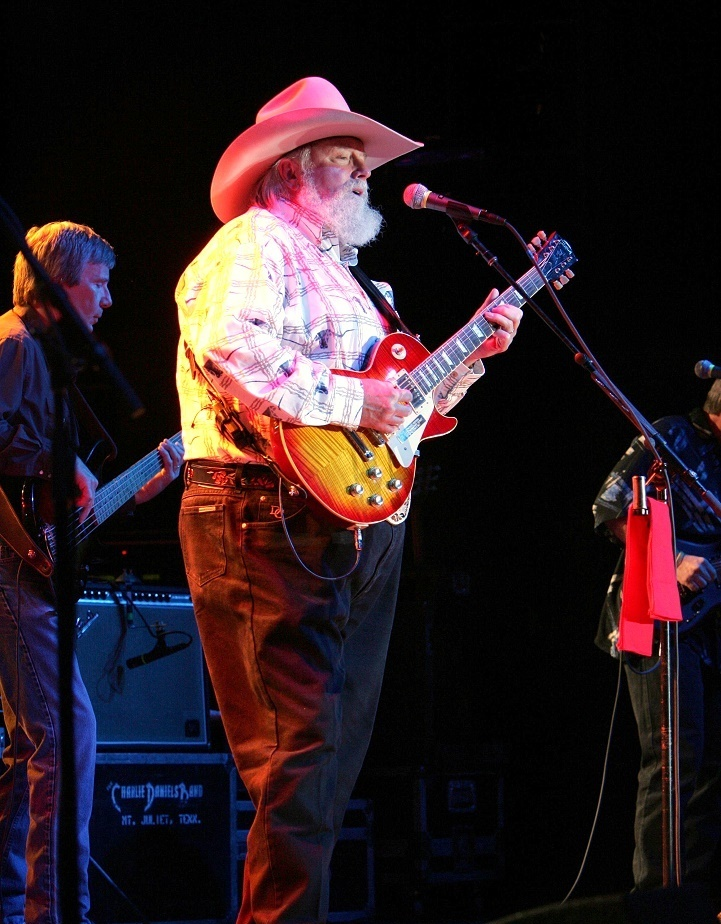
Charlie Daniels, who staged Volunteer Jam at the venue between 1976 and 1985

In 1967, the auditorium hosted the Country Music Association's first CMA Awards event, before the ceremonies moved to the Ryman Auditorium the following year.

The 3rd GMA Dove Awards were held at the venue on October 9, 1971.

David Bowie's performance at the venue on November 30, 1974, was released in part on I'm Only Dancing (The Soul Tour 74).

Charlie Daniels Band staged their annual Volunteer Jam concerts at the venue from 1976 to 1985.

Ted Nugent's July 1977 performance at the venue was released in part on Double Live Gonzo!.

The Grateful Dead's April 22, 1978 concert at the venue was released as the live album Dave's Picks Volume 15.

Auditions for Season 2 (2003), Season 14 (2015), and Season 18 (2020) of American Idol were held at the venue. Eventual Season 2 winner Ruben Studdard was discovered at the 2003 audition.

The 35th GMA Dove Awards were held at the venue on April 28, 2004.

Due to the damage at Grand Ole Opry House because of the May 2010 Tennessee floods, the venue hosted the June 8, 2010 edition of the Grand Ole Opry.

The 29th Stellar Awards were held at the venue on January 18, 2014.

Carrie Underwood filmed the video for her song "Cry Pretty" at the venue in 2018.

The 2022 CMT Music Awards were held at the venue on April 11, 2022.

==== Political events ====
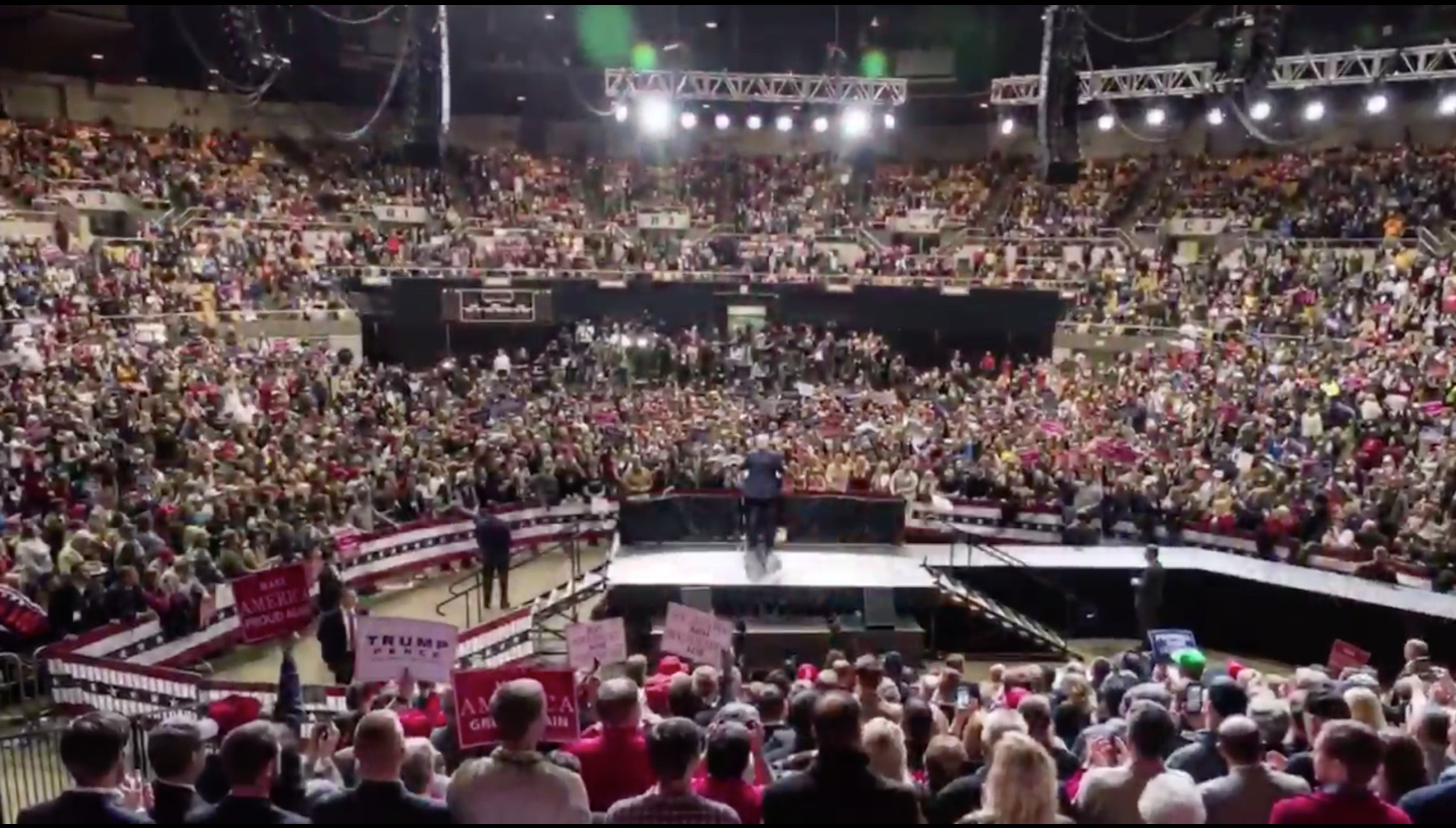
Donald Trump rally on March 15, 2017

President Donald Trump appeared on March 15, 2017, for a rally and speech. According to a public address announcement in the venue, thousands more were unable to attend leaving empty seats in the upper level. This announcement was highly controversial as there was no evidence the upper level tickets were ever sold.

=== Special features ===
==== Musicians' Hall of Fame and Museum ====
On June 4, 2013, the auditorium began housing the Musicians Hall of Fame and Museum within its exhibition hall. The museum was relocated from Music City Center due to construction.

Events and tenants
Preceded by Inaugural	Host of CMA Awards; 1967	Succeeded by Grand Ole Opry House
Preceded by Murphy Center	Host of Volunteer Jam; 1976–1985	Succeeded by Starwood Amphitheatre
Preceded by Inaugural	Host of WrestleWar; 1989	Succeeded by Greensboro Coliseum
Preceded by Independence Arena	Host of Starrcade; 1994; 1995; 1996	Succeeded by MCI Center
Preceded by San Jose Arena	Host of U.S. Figure Skating Championships; 1997	Succeeded by CoreStates Center
Preceded by Cow Palace	Host of SuperBrawl; 2001	Succeeded by Final
Preceded by Striplin Gym	Home of Belmont Bruins; 2001–2003	Succeeded by Curb Event Center
Preceded by TNA Impact! Zone	Host of Slammiversary; 2007	Succeeded by DeSoto Civic Center
Preceded by U.S. Bank Arena	Host of Lockdown; 2012	Succeeded by Alamodome
Preceded by Bridgestone Arena	Host of CMT Music Awards; 2022	Succeeded by Moody Center
