= Stevi Schnoor =

Canada athlete (born 1985)

Personal information
- Born: September 14, 1985 (age 41) British Columbia, Canada
- Occupation: Teacher
- Height: 1.73 m (5 ft 8 in)
- Weight: 75 kg (165 lb)

Rugby union career
International career
Years	Team	Apps	(Points)
2009	Canada		
National sevens team
Years	Team		Comps
- Canada

Sport
- Football career

Career history
- 2012-13: BC Angels
- 2013-17: Seattle Mist
- 2018: Nashville Knights
- Rugby league career

Playing information
- Position: Half
Representative
Years	Team	Pld	T	G	FG	P
2017	Canada

Stevi Schnoor (born September 14, 1985) is a Canadian American football and rugby football player who represented Canada at the 2017 Women's Rugby League World Cup.

== Playing career ==
From British Columbia, Schnoor attended Simon Fraser University and is a teacher.

Schnoor played inside centre in rugby union at high school and was selected for the national team for the 2009 Nations Cup. She played in three test matches and also played rugby sevens at tournaments in Calgary, Cuba and Las Vegas.

She then played for the BC Angels, Seattle Mist and Nashville Knights in the Legends Football League as a running back and a linebacker.

Schnoor later switched to rugby league and represented the Canada Ravens at the 2017 Women's Rugby League World Cup.
