= Chicago Blitz (X League) =

American women's gridiron football team

Logo

General information
- Founded: 2020 (franchise); 2022 (competition)
- Stadium: BMO Harris Bank Center
- Headquartered: Rockford, Illinois
- Colors: Neon Orange, Blue
- Website: xleague.live/chicago-blitz/

Personnel
- Head coach: Sidney Lewis

League / conference affiliations
- X League

Championships
- X Cup wins: 1 (2022)

The Chicago Blitz are a women's American football team in the Extreme Football League (X League) based in Rockford, Illinois, a city west of Chicago. They won the league's inaugural championship, the X Cup, in 2022.

== History ==
The Extreme Football League (X League) was announced in December 2019, as a successor to the Legends Football League (LFL). The announcement included the Blitz, a successor to the LFL's Chicago Bliss. The X League's 2020 season was postponed, and the league also did not operate during 2021, amid the COVID-19 pandemic.

The Blitz first competed during the 2022 X League season, winning both of their regular season games, over the Kansas City Force and Seattle Thunder. The Blitz advanced to the postseason, where they again defeated Seattle to advance to the X Cup championship match against the Atlanta Empire. On September 10, the Blitz defeated the Empire, 19–12, to win the league's inaugural championship.
