= The Blackwood Brothers discography =

This is a discography for the Gospel Music Hall of Fame group The Blackwood Brothers.

== Albums ==
| Year | Album | Members Who Performed | Record label |
|---|---|---|---|
| 1952 | Favorite Gospel Songs and Spirituals | James, R. W., Dan Huskey, Bill Lyles, Jackie Marshall | RCA Victor |
| 1956 | Hymn Sing | James, J. D. Sumner, Cecil, Bill Shaw, Jackie Marshall | RCA Victor |
| 1957 | I’m Bound For That City | James, J. D. Sumner, Cecil, Bill Shaw, Jackie Marshall | RCA Victor |
| 1958 | His Hands | James, J. D. Sumner, Cecil, Bill Shaw, Jackie Marshall | RCA Victor |
| 1959 | The Stranger Of Galilee | James, J. D. Sumner, Cecil, Bill Shaw, Jackie Marshall | RCA Victor |
| 1959 | Paradise Island | James, J. D. Sumner, Cecil, Bill Shaw, Jackie Marshall | RCA Victor |
| 1959 | The Blackwood Brothers | James, J. D. Sumner, Cecil, Bill Shaw, Jackie Marshall | RCA Camden |
| 1959 | Give The World A Smile | James, J. D. Sumner, Cecil, Bill Shaw, Wally Varner | Skylite Records |
| 1960 | Sunday Meetin Time | James, J. D. Sumner, Cecil, Bill Shaw, Wally Varner | Skylite Records |
| 1960 | The Blackwood Brothers In Concert | James, J. D. Sumner, Cecil, Bill Shaw, Wally Varner | RCA Victor |
| 1960 | Beautiful Isle Of Somewhere | James, J. D. Sumner, Cecil, Bill Shaw, Wally Varner | RCA Victor |
| 1961 | The Blackwood Brothers On Tour | James, J. D. Sumner, Cecil, Bill Shaw, Wally Varner | RCA Victor |
| 1961 | The Pearly White City | James, J. D. Sumner, Cecil, Bill Shaw, Wally Varner | RCA Victor |
| 1962 | Precious Memories | James, J. D. Sumner, Cecil, Bill Shaw, Wally Varner | RCA Victor |
| 1962 | Silver Anniversary Album | James, J. D. Sumner, Cecil, Bill Shaw, Wally Varner | RCA Victor |
| 1962 | The Blackwood Brothers with The Statesmen Wish You a Musical Merry Christmas | James, J. D. Sumner, Cecil, Bill Shaw, Wally Varner | RCA Victor |
| 1962 | The Keys To The Kingdom | James, J. D. Sumner, Cecil, Bill Shaw, Wally Varner | RCA Camden |
| 1962 | At Home With The Blackwoods | James, J. D. Sumner, Cecil, Bill Shaw, Wally Varner | Skylite Records |
| 1963 | On Stage | James, J. D. Sumner, Cecil, Bill Shaw, Wally Varner | RCA Victor |
| 1963 | The Blackwood Brothers Quartet Featuring Their Famous Bass J. D. Sumner | James, J. D. Sumner, Cecil, Bill Shaw, Wally Varner | RCA Victor |
| 1963 | Give Us This Day | James, J. D. Sumner, Cecil, Bill Shaw, Wally Varner | RCA Camden |
| 1964 | Gloryland Jubilee | James, J. D. Sumner, Cecil, Bill Shaw, Wally Varner | RCA Camden |
| 1964 | Blackwood Family Album | James, J. D. Sumner, Cecil, Bill Shaw, Wally Varner | Skylite Records |
| 1964 | The Blackwood Brothers Quartet Featuring James Blackwood | James, J. D. Sumner, Cecil, Bill Shaw, Wally Varner | RCA Victor |
| 1964 | The Blackwood Brothers Quartet Present Their Exciting Tenor Bill Shaw | Cecil, J.D. Sumner, Bill Shaw, James, Whitey Gleason | RCA Victor |
| 1965 | Something Old - Something New | Cecil, J.D. Sumner, Bill Shaw, James, Whitey Gleason | RCA Victor |
| 1965 | The Blackwood Brothers Quartet Featuring Cecil Blackwood | Cecil, J.D. Sumner, Bill Shaw, James, Whitey Gleason | RCA Victor |
| 1965 | Do You Thank The Lord Each Day | Cecil, J.D. Sumner, Bill Shaw, James, Whitey Gleason | RCA Camden |
| 1966 | On The Jericho Road | Cecil, Bill Shaw, James, John Hall, Whitey Gleason | RCA Camden |
| 1966 | How Big Is God | Cecil, Bill Shaw, James, John Hall, Whitey Gleason | RCA Victor |
| 1966 | The Sound Of Gospel Music | Cecil, Bill Shaw, James, John Hall, Whitey Gleason | RCA Victor |
| 1966 | The Grand Old Gospel (with Porter Wagoner) | Bill Shaw, James, Cecil, John Hall, David Weston | King |
| 1967 | With A Song On My Lips (And A Prayer In My Heart) | Bill Shaw, James, Cecil, John Hall, David Weston | RCA Camden |
| 1967 | The Blackwood Brothers Quartet Featuring Big John Hall | Bill Shaw, James, Cecil, John Hall, David Weston | RCA^{?} |
| 1967 | Songs For Joy | Bill Shaw, James, Cecil, John Hall, David Weston | RCA^{?} |
| 1967 | Surely Goodness And Mercy (with George Beverly Shea) | Bill Shaw, James, Cecil, John Hall, David Weston | RCA^{?} |
| 1968 | It Is No Secret | Bill Shaw, James, Cecil, John Hall, David Weston | Skylite Records |
| 1968 | In The Sweet By And By | Bill Shaw, James, Cecil, John Hall, David Weston | RCA Camden |
| 1968 | The Fabulous Blackwood Brothers Quartet | Bill Shaw, James, Cecil, John Hall, David Weston | RCA Victor |
| 1968 | Yours Faithfully | Cecil, Bill Shaw, James, London Parris, Dave Weston | RCA Victor |
| 1968 | In Gospel Country | Cecil, Bill Shaw, James, London Parris, Dave Weston | |
| 1968 | All Day Singing | Cecil, Bill Shaw, James, London Parris, Dave Weston | Skylite Records |
| 1969 | The Heavenly Harmony Of The Blackwood Brothers Quartet | Cecil, Bill Shaw, James, London Parris, Dave Weston | |
| 1969 | Fill My Cup Lord | Cecil, Bill Shaw, James, London Parris, Dave Weston | RCA Victor |
| 1969 | Just A Closer Walk With Thee | Cecil, Bill Shaw, James, London Parris, Dave Weston | RCA Camden |
| 1969 | O Come All Ye Faithful | Cecil, Bill Shaw, James, London Parris, Dave Weston | |
| 1970 | Gospel Classics | Cecil, Bill Shaw, James, London Parris, Dave Weston | |
| 1970 | My God And I | Cecil, Bill Shaw, James, London Parris, Dave Weston | |
| 1970 | Oh Happy Day | Cecil, Bill Shaw, James, London Parris, Dave Weston | RCA Camden |
| 1971 | Sheltered In The Arms Of God | James, Cecil, Jimmy, London Parris, Bill Shaw | RCA Camden |
| 1971 | Amazing Grace | James, Cecil, Jimmy, London Parris, Bill Shaw | RCA Camden |
| 1971 | Put Your Hand In The Hand | James, Cecil, Jimmy, London Parris, Bill Shaw | RCA Camden |
| 1971 | The Blackwood Brothers Quartet Featuring London Parris | James, Cecil, Jimmy, London Parris, Bill Shaw | RCA Victor |
| 1971 | He’s Still The King Of Kings And Lord Of Lords | James, Cecil, Jimmy, London Parris, Bill Shaw | RCA Victor |
| 1972 | L-O-V-E | James, Cecil, Jimmy, London Parris, Bill Shaw | RCA Victor |
| 1972 | This Could Be The Dawning | | RCA Victor |
| 1972 | Roll On Jordan | | |
| 1972 | Release Me (From My Sin) | James, Cecil, Jimmy, Ken Turner, Bill Shaw, Tommy Fairchild | Skylite Records |
| 1972 | Mighty Clouds Of Joy | James, Cecil, Jimmy, Ken Turner, Bill Shaw, Tommy Fairchild | RCA Camden |
| 1973 | How Great Thou Art | James, Cecil, Jimmy, Ken Turner, Bill Shaw, Tommy Fairchild | RCA Camden |
| 1973 | On Stage | James, Cecil, Jimmy, Ken Turner, Bill Shaw, Tommy Fairchild | Skylite Records |
| 1973 | Hallelujah To The King | James, Cecil, Jimmy, Ken Turner, Bill Shaw, Tommy Fairchild | Skylite Records |
| 1973 | Turn Your Radio On | James, Cecil, Jimmy, Ken Turner, Bill Shaw, Tommy Fairchild | ARAA Records |
| 1973 | My Sweet Saviour’s Love | James, Cecil, Jimmy, Ken Turner, Bill Shaw, Tommy Fairchild | ARAA Records |
| 1973 | A Father’s Prayer | James, Cecil, Jimmy, Ken Turner, Bill Shaw, Tommy Fairchild | Skylite Records |
| 1973 | It’s Worth It All | James, Cecil, Jimmy, Ken Turner, Bill Shaw, Tommy Fairchild | Skylite Records |
| 1974 | There He Goes | James, Cecil, Jimmy, Ken Turner, Pat Hoffmaster, Tommy Fairchild | Skylite Records |
| 1974 | Let’s Make A Joyful Noise | James, Cecil, Jimmy, Ken Turner, Pat Hoffmaster, Tommy Fairchild | Skylite Records |
| 1975 | What A Beautiful Day For The Lord To Come Again | James, Cecil, Jimmy, Ken Turner, Pat Hoffmaster, Tommy Fairchild | Skylite Records |
| 1975 | Keep On Singing Featuring James Blackwood | James, Cecil, Jimmy, Ken Turner, Pat Hoffmaster, Tommy Fairchild | Skylite Records |
| 1975 | Hallelujah Meetin’ | James, Cecil, Jimmy, Ken Turner, Pat Hoffmaster, Tommy Fairchild | Skylite Records |
| 1975 | Hymns Of Gold | James, Cecil, Jimmy, Ken Turner, Pat Hoffmaster, Tommy Fairchild | Skylite Records |
| 1976 | Learning To Lean | James, Cecil, Jimmy, Ken Turner, Pat Hoffmaster, Tommy Fairchild | Skylite Records |
| 1976 | Lord We Praise You | James, Cecil, Jimmy, Ken Turner, Pat Hoffmaster, Tommy Fairchild | Skylite Records |
| 1977 | Live! From Nashville Spotlighting James Blackwood | James, Cecil, Jimmy, Ken Turner, Pat Hoffmaster, Tommy Fairchild | Skylite Records |
| 1977 | Bill Gaither Songs | James, Cecil, Jimmy, Ken Turner, Pat Hoffmaster, Tommy Fairchild | Skylite Records |
| 1977 | Jesus Let Me Write You A Song | James, Cecil, Jimmy, Ken Turner, Pat Hoffmaster, Tommy Fairchild | Skylite Records |
| 1978 | His Amazing Love | James, Cecil, Jimmy, Ken Turner, Pat Hoffmaster, Tommy Fairchild | Skylite Records |
| 1978 | Lift Up The Name Of Jesus | James, Cecil, Jimmy, Ken Turner, Pat Hoffmaster, Tommy Fairchild | Skylite Records |
| 1979 | Featuring Cecil Blackwood | James, Cecil, Jimmy, Ken Turner, Pat Hoffmaster, Tommy Fairchild | Skylite Records |
| 1979 | Live! In Music City USA | James, Cecil, Jimmy, Ken Turner, Pat Hoffmaster, Tommy Fairchild | Skylite Records |
| 1979 | Live! At The National Quartet Convention | James, Cecil, Jimmy, Ken Turner, Pat Hoffmaster, Tommy Fairchild | Skylite Records |
| 1979 | Hymns By The Blackwood Brothers | James, Cecil, Jimmy, Ken Turner, Pat Hoffmaster, Tommy Fairchild | Skylite Records |
| 1979 | The Blackwood Brothers Featuring John Cox | James, Cecil, Jimmy, John Cox, Ken Turner, Tommy Fairchild | Skylite Records |
| 1979 | Merry Christmas From The Blackwood Brothers | James, Cecil, Jimmy, John Cox, Ken Turner, Tommy Fairchild | Voice Box Records |
| 1980 | We Come To Worship | James, Cecil, Jimmy, John Cox, Ken Turner, Tommy Fairchild | Voice Box Records |
| 1980 | Hymns Of The Church | | Skylite Records |
| 1980 | Until Then | | Skylite Records |
| 1980 | On The Jericho Road | | Skylite Records |
| 1981 | The Joy Of Knowing Jesus | James, Cecil, Jimmy, Ken Turner, Pat Hoffmaster, Tommy Fairchild | Skylite Records |
| 1981 | Hits Of The Century | James, Cecil, Jimmy, Ken Turner, Pat Hoffmaster, Tommy Fairchild | Skylite Records |
| 1982 | Joy Comes In The Morning | James, Cecil, Jimmy, Ken Turner, Pat Hoffmaster, Tommy Fairchild | Skylite Records |
| 1982 | Rise And Be Healed | James, Cecil, Jimmy, Ken Turner, Pat Hoffmaster, Tommy Fairchild | |
| 1982 | How Great Thou Art | James, Cecil, Jimmy, Ken Turner, Pat Hoffmaster, Tommy Fairchild | RCA Camden |
| 1982 | I'm Following You | James, Cecil, Jimmy, Ken Turner, Pat Hoffmaster, Tommy Fairchild | Voice Box Records |
| 1983 | Because He Lives | | Skylite Records |
| 1983 | The Family Of God | | Skylite Records |
| 1983 | Perfect Heart | | Skylite Records |
| 1983 | Second To None | Robert Crawford, Rick Price, Jimmy Blackwood, Cecil Blackwood, Ken Turner | Skylite Records |
| 1984 | He Touched Me | | Skylite Records |
| 1984 | 1954: The Final Curtain | Bill Shaw, James, RW, Bill Lyles, Jack Marshall | Gusto |
| 1985 | Old Time Singing | | Skylite Records |
| 1985 | Safe In The Arms Of Jesus | RW Blackwood Jr, Jimmy Blackwood, Cecil Blackwood, Ken Turner, Jeff Stice | Skylite Records |
| 1985 | That Brighter Day | RW Blackwood Jr, Jimmy Blackwood, Cecil Blackwood, Ken Turner, Jeff Stice | Voice Box |
| 1985 | I Bowed On My Knees And Cried Holy | | Voice Box Records |
| 1986 | The Answer | Jerry Trammell, RW Blackwood Jr, Cecil Blackwood, Ken Turner | Calvary Records |
| 1990 | Turning the Soil | Darren Krauter, Mark Blackwood, Cecil Blackwood, Jeff McMann | Sounds Unreel |
| 1996 | Still Alive | Paul Acree, Mark Blackwood, Chris Blackwood, Cecil Blackwood | |
| 1997 | The Blackwoods (Gaither Gospel Series) | | Spring House |
| 1998 | Beulah Land | Steve Warren, Mike LoPrinzi, Cecil Blackwood, Eric Winston | Custom |
| 1998 | Augusta Live | Steve Warren, Mike LoPrinzi, Cecil Blackwood, Eric Winston | Bibletone |
| 1999 | Blackwood Brothers Quartet Sing Songs Elvis Sang | Steve Warren, Rick Price, Cecil Blackwood, Eric Winston | Custom |
| 2000 | Something Beautiful | | Brentwood |
| 2000 | The Legend Goes On | | Classics |
| 2005 | Radio Shows of the 30s, 40s, and 50s | | |
| 2006 | The Family of God | Jimmy, Randy Byrd, Brad White, Wayne Little | St Clair Records |
| 2007 | Rock Of Ages: Hymns Of The Faith | Jimmy, Randy Byrd, Brad White, Wayne Little | |
| 2007 | Live In Cape Coral | Jimmy, Randy Byrd, Brad White, Wayne Little | |
| 2010 | 75 Years: The Song Will Go On | Jimmy, Wayne Little, Randy Byrd, Billy | Daywind Records |
| 2011 | Softly and Tenderly | Jimmy, Wayne Little, Randy Byrd, Billy, Mike Hammontree | Independent Release |
| 2011 | Live From Florida | Jimmy, Wayne Little, Randy Byrd, Billy, Mike Hammontree | Independent Release |
| 2012 | Sweet Songs About Heaven | Jimmy, Wayne Little, Butch Owens, Billy | Daywind Records |
| 2013 | Live! In Concert | Billy, Wayne Little, Butch Owens, Michael Helwig | Independent Release |
| 2014 | Forever: 80th Anniversary | Billy, Wayne Little, Butch Owens, Michael Helwig | Daywind Records |
| 2016 | Classics, Volume One | Billy, Wayne Little, Butch Owens, Michael Helwig | Daywind Records |
| 2018 | A Capella Hymns | Billy, Wayne Little, Butch Owens, Jonathan Mattingly | Daywind Records |
| 2023 | Tribute to the King | Billy, Jim Rogers, Eric Walker, Jonathan Mattingly | Daywind Records |

=== Compilations ===
- 1960: Statesmen-Blackwood Favorites
- 1964: TV Requests
- 1964: The Best Of The Blackwood Brothers Quartet
- 1967: The Best Of The Blackwood Brothers Quartet, Volume 2
- 1970: Skylite Presents The Best Of The Blackwood Brothers
- 1972: Memorial Album, Vol. 1
- 1973: Memorial Album, Vol. 2 Featuring R.W. Blackwood and Bill Lyles
- 1973: Best of the Best of The Blackwood Brothers
- 1977: Sixteen All-Time Favorites
- 1982: Through The Years...Live!
- 1985: All Their Best
- 1986: Best Of The Blackwood Brothers
- 1990: Blackwood Brothers Classics, Vol. 1
- 1990: Blackwood Brothers Classics, Vol. 2
- 1990: Blackwood Brothers Classics, Vol. 3
- 1991: Blackwood Brothers Classics, Vol. 4
- 1991: Blackwood Brothers Classics, Vol. 5
- 2002: "Rock-a-My-Soul [Box Set (Bear Family)]
- 2015: "The Ultimate Blackwood Brothers: 80 Years, 80 Songs [Box Set (Daywind)]
