= GMA Dove Award =

American award for achievements in Christian music

Dove Award
- Current: 57th GMA Dove Awards
- Dove Awards logo
- Awarded for: Christian music industry achievement award
- Country: United States
- Presented by: Gospel Music Association
- First award: 1969
- Website: doveawards.com

A Dove Award is an accolade by the Gospel Music Association (GMA) of the United States to recognize outstanding achievement in the Christian music industry. The awards ceremonies presented annually and have been held in Nashville, Tennessee except in 2011 and 2012 when they were held in Atlanta, Georgia. The ceremonies feature live musical performances and are broadcast on TBN.

The awards were established in 1969 and represent a variety of musical styles including rock, pop, hip hop, country, and urban.

== History ==
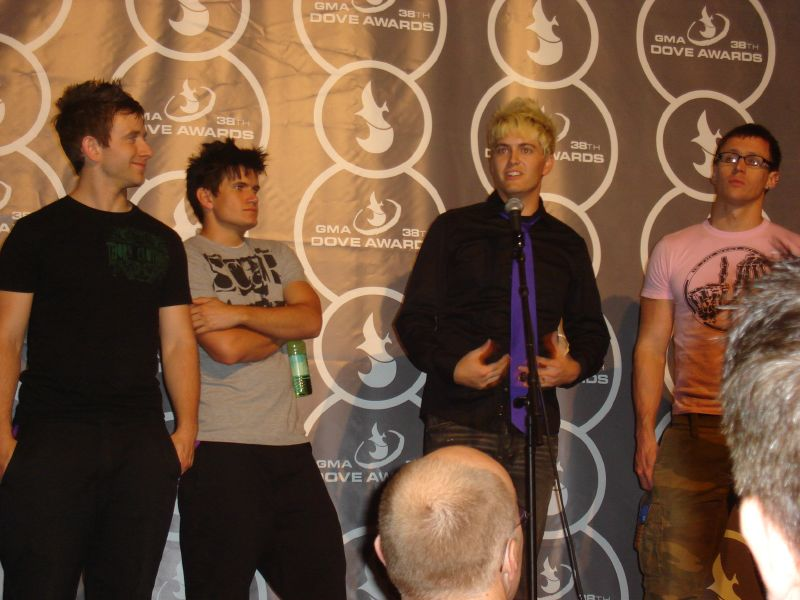
Stellar Kart at a press conference after the GMA Dove Awards in Nashville, Tennessee, USA, in 2007

The Dove Awards were originally conceptualized by Gospel singer and songwriter Bill Gaither at a Gospel Music Association board meeting in 1968. The idea of the award being represented by a dove is credited to Gaither and the design for the award itself is credited to gospel singer Les Beasley and designer Bob McConnell. The first GMA Dove Awards were held at the Peabody Hotel in Memphis, Tennessee in October 1969. In 1971, the awards moved to Nashville.

The 3rd GMA Dove Awards of 1971 were deemed invalid due to apparent ballot stuffing by the southern gospel group the Blackwood Brothers and that year is still not considered an official awards year by the Gospel Music Association. There were no awards held in 1979 due to a decision by the Gospel Music Association to move the awards from autumn to spring. Every ceremony since then has been held in the spring. The first televised ceremony was the 15th GMA Dove Awards of 1984 which aired on the Christian Broadcasting Network.

The awards were held in Nashville until 2011 before being presented at the Fox Theatre in Atlanta, Georgia in 2012. They returned to Nashville in 2013, and were held at the Allen Arena on the campus of Lipscomb University until 2024. In 2025, the Bridgestone Arena was chosen as the new home.

== Categories ==
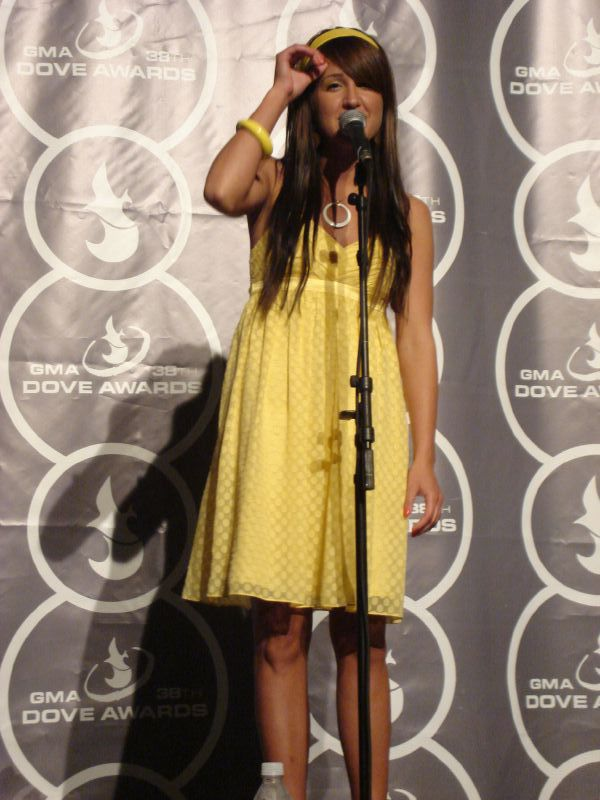
Britt Nicole at the 2008 Dove Awards

Because of the large number of award categories (42 in 2012), and the desire to feature several performances by various artists, only the ones with the most popular interest are presented directly at the televised version of the award ceremony.

=== General ===
The "General Field" includes seven awards which are not restricted by genre:

- Song of the Year is awarded to the songwriter and the publisher.
- Dove Award for Songwriter of the Year (since 2015 two awards have been given in this category: one for a songwriter who is an artist, and one who is a non-artist)
- Male Vocalist of the Year
- Female Vocalist of the Year
- Group of the Year
- Artist of the Year
- New Artist of the Year
- Producer of the Year

Other awards are given for performances in specific genres as well as for other contributions such as artwork and video. As of the 43rd Dove Awards, these include:

=== Inspirational ===
- Inspirational Recorded Song of the Year
- Inspirational Album of the Year

=== Pop ===
- Pop/Contemporary Recorded Song of the Year
- Pop/Contemporary Album of the Year

=== Southern Gospel ===
- Southern Gospel Recorded Song of the Year
- Southern Gospel Album of the Year

=== Gospel (soul/black) ===
- Traditional Gospel Recorded Song of the Year
- Traditional Gospel Album of the Year
- Contemporary Gospel Recorded Song of the Year
- Contemporary Gospel Album of the Year

=== Musicals ===
- Musical of the Year
- Youth/Children's Musical of the Year

=== Praise & Worship ===
- Worship Song of the Year
- Worship-Recorded Song of the Year
- Worship Album of the Year

=== Country & Bluegrass ===
- Country Recorded Song of the Year
- Country Album of the Year
- Bluegrass Recorded Song of the Year
- Bluegrass Album of the Year

=== Rock ===
- Rock Recorded Song of the Year
- Rock/Contemporary Recorded Song of the Year
- Rock Album of the Year
- Rock/Contemporary Album of the Year

=== Rap/Hip Hop & Urban ===
- Rap/Hip Hop Recorded Song of the Year
- Rap/Hip Hop Album of the Year
- Urban Recorded Song of the Year

=== Miscellaneous ===
- Instrumental Album of the Year
- Children's Music Album of the Year
- Spanish Language Album of the Year
- Special Event Album of the Year
- Christmas Album of the Year
- Choral Collection of the Year
- Recorded Music Packaging
- Short Form Music Video of the Year
- Long Form Music Video of the Year
- Inspirational Film of the Year

== Eligibility rules ==
In 1998, the GMA published a new definition of what music was eligible for a Dove Award, holding that all nominees had to be:

- Substantially based upon historically orthodox Christian truth contained in or derived from the Holy Bible
- An expression of worship of God or praise for His works
- Testimony of relationship with God through Christ
- Obviously prompted and informed by a Christian worldview

Prior to the definition, the only requirement was for a record to be sold in Christian Booksellers Association affiliated stores. The New York Times later attributed these stricter rules to backlash over the Amy Grant album Behind the Eyes winning the award for Pop/Contemporary album earlier that year, whose lyrics Christianity Today argued were effectively secular in nature. The new standards resulted in complaints by some fans and artists after thirteen entries were disqualified as being too secular in the 1999 Dove Awards. The rules were rescinded afterwards and many groups disqualified by the rulings in 1999 were winners in 2000.

As of 2019, the GMA's policy stipulates that eligible music is "based upon the historically orthodox Christian faith contained in or derived from the Holy Bible or apparently prompted and informed by a Christian world-view".

== See also ==
- Christian pop culture
- Gospel Music Association of Canada Covenant Awards
- List of religion-related awards
