= 2007–08 Austin Peay Governors basketball team =

American college basketball season

2007–08 Austin Peay Governors basketball

Ohio Valley Tournament champions

NCAA tournament, first round
- Conference: Ohio Valley Conference
- West Division
- Record: 24–11 (16–4 OVC)
- Head coach: Dave Loos (18th season)
- Assistant coaches: Jay Bowen; Kevin Hogan; Julian Terrell
- Home arena: Dunn Center

2007–08 Ohio Valley Conference men's basketball standings
	Conf.				Overall
Team	W		L	PCT	W		L	PCT
Austin Peay †	16	–	4	.800	24	–	11	.686
Murray State	13	–	7	.650	18	–	13	.581
Morehead State	12	–	8	.600	15	–	15	.500
UT Martin	11	–	9	.550	17	–	16	.515
Samford	10	–	10	.500	14	–	16	.467
Tennessee State	10	–	10	.500	15	–	17	.469
Tennessee Tech	10	–	10	.500	13	–	19	.406
Eastern Kentucky	10	–	10	.500	14	–	16	.467
Eastern Illinois	6	–	14	.300	7	–	22	.241
Jacksonville State	5	–	15	.250	7	–	22	.241
Southeast Missouri State	7	–	13	.350	12	–	19	.387
† 2008 OVC tournament winner Rankings from AP Poll

The 2007–08 Austin Peay Governors basketball team represented Austin Peay State University during the 2007–08 NCAA Division I men's basketball season. The Governors, led by 18th year head coach Dave Loos, played their home games at the Dunn Center and were members of the West Division of the Ohio Valley Conference. They finished the season 24–11, 16–4 in OVC play. They won the OVC tournament to earn the conference's automatic bid to the NCAA tournament. As the No. 15 seed in the South region, they lost to Texas in the first round.

== Roster ==
2007–08 Austin Peay Governors men's basketball team
Players	Coaches
Pos. / # / Name / Height / Weight / Year / Hometown; F / 2 / Drake Reed / 6 ft 5 in (1.96 m) / 210 lb (95 kg) / Jr / Clarksville, Tennessee	Head coach: Dave Loos (Memphis); Assistant coach(es) Legend: (C) Team captain; (S) Suspended; (I) Ineligible; (W) Walk-on; Injured; Current redshirt

== Schedule and results ==
Date time, TV	Rank^{#}	Opponent^{#}	Result	Record	Site (attendance) city, state
Regular season
Nov 10, 2007*		at Vanderbilt	L 67–81	0–1	Memorial Gymnasium; Nashville, Tennessee
Nov 17, 2007*		Belmont	W 71–56	1–1	Dunn Center; Clarksville, Tennessee
Nov 20, 2007*		at Utah State	L 68–71	1–2	Dee Glen Smith Spectrum; Logan, Utah
Nov 23, 2007*		vs. Florida Gulf Coast; South Padre Island Invitational	W 67–57	2–2	South Padre Island Convention Centre; South Padre Island, Texas
Nov 24, 2007*		vs. Valparaiso; South Padre Island Invitational	L 47–61	2–3	South Padre Island Convention Centre; South Padre Island, Texas
Nov 27, 2007*		at No. 3 Memphis	L 82–104	2–4	FedExForum; Memphis, Tennessee
Dec 1, 2007		at Tennessee Tech	W 79–76	3–4 (1–0)	Eblen Center; Cookeville, Tennessee
Dec 6, 2007		Morehead State	W 67–63	4–4 (2–0)	Dunn Center; Nashville, Tennessee
Dec 8, 2007*		at Evansville	L 62–72	4–5	Roberts Stadium; Evansville, Indiana
Dec 15, 2007*		Akron	L 55–64	4–6	Dunn Center; Nashville, Tennessee
Dec 19, 2007*		at Belmont	W 93–84	5–6	Curb Event Center; Nashville, Tennessee
Dec 22, 2007		Eastern Kentucky	W 75–67	6–6 (3–0)	Dunn Center; Nashville, Tennessee
Dec 29, 2007*		at Middle Tennessee	W 78–75	7–6	Murphy Center; Murfreesboro, Tennessee
Jan 3, 2008		at UT Martin	W 90–85 ^{OT}	8–6 (4–0)	Skyhawk Arena; Martin, Tennessee
Jan 5, 2008		Jacksonville State	W 71–55	9–6 (5–0)	Dunn Center; Nashville, Tennessee
Jan 7, 2008		Eastern Illinois	W 73–57	10–6 (6–0)	Dunn Center; Nashville, Tennessee
Jan 10, 2008		at Murray State	L 70–82	10–7 (6–1)	Regional Special Events Center; Murray, Kentucky
Jan 12, 2008		Southeast Missouri State	W 85–82	11–7 (7–1)	Dunn Center; Nashville, Tennessee
Jan 17, 2008		UT Martin	W 86–71	12–7 (8–1)	Dunn Center; Nashville, Tennessee
Jan 24, 2008		at Jacksonville State	W 73–62	13–7 (9–1)	Pete Mathews Coliseum; Jacksonville, Alabama
Jan 26, 2008		at Samford	L 49–63	13–8 (9–2)	Pete Hanna Center; Birmingham, Alabama
Jan 29, 2008		at Southeast Missouri State	L 116–121 ^{3OT}	13–9 (9–3)	Show Me Center; Cape Girardeau, Missouri
Jan 31, 2008		Murray State	W 92–87 ^{OT}	14–9 (10–3)	Winfield Dunn Center; Nashville, Tennessee
Feb 2, 2008		Tennessee State	W 79–78	15–9 (11–3)	Dunn Center; Nashville, Tennessee
Feb 7, 2008		at Eastern Illinois	W 72–52	16–9 (12–3)	Lantz Arena; Charleston, Illinois
Feb 9, 2008		Samford	W 67–49	17–9 (13–3)	Dunn Center; Nashville, Tennessee
Feb 16, 2008		Tennessee Tech	W 80–76	18–9 (14–3)	Dunn Center; Nashville, Tennessee
Feb 18, 2008		at Tennessee State	L 69–73	18–10 (14–4)	Gentry Complex; Nashville, Tennessee
Feb 23, 2008*		Georgia Southern	W 80–72	19–10	Dunn Center; Nashville, Tennessee
Feb 28, 2008		at Eastern Kentucky	W 65–59	20–10 (15–4)	McBrayer Arena; Richmond, Kentucky
Mar 1, 2008		at Morehead State	W 72–56	21–10 (16–4)	Ellis Johnson Arena; Morehead, Kentucky
Ohio Valley Conference tournament
Mar 4, 2008*		Eastern Kentucky	W 76–51	22–10	Winfield Dunn Center; Nashville, Tennessee
Mar 7, 2008*		vs. Tennessee-Martin	W 78–77	23–10	Nashville Municipal Auditorium; Nashville, Tennessee
Mar 8, 2008*		at Tennessee State	W 82–64	24–10	Nashville Municipal Auditorium; Nashville, Tennessee
NCAA tournament
Mar 21, 2008*	(15 S)	vs. (2 S) No. 7 Texas; First Round	L 54–74	24–11	Alltel Arena; North Little Rock, Arkansas
*Non-conference game. ^{#}Rankings from AP Poll. (#) Tournament seedings in parentheses. S=South Region. All times are in Central Time.
