= Atlanta Empire =

American women's gridiron football team

Logo

General information
- Founded: 2020 (franchise); 2022 (competition)
- Stadium: Gas South Arena
- Headquartered: Duluth, Georgia
- Colors: Neon Pink, Black
- Website: xleague.live/atlanta-empire/

Personnel
- Owners: Dane Robinson, X League
- Head coach: Dane Robinson

League / conference affiliations
- X League

The Atlanta Empire are a women's American football team in the Extreme Football League (X League) based in Duluth, Georgia, a suburb of Atlanta. The team is coached and co-owned by Dane Robinson.

== History ==
The Extreme Football League (X League) was announced in December 2019, as a successor to the Legends Football League (LFL). The announcement included the Empire, a successor to the LFL's Atlanta Steam. The X League's 2020 season was postponed, and the league also did not operate during 2021, amid the COVID-19 pandemic.

The Empire first competed during the 2022 X League season, winning both of their regular season games, over the Austin Sound and Denver Rush. The Empire advanced to the postseason, where they again defeated Austin to advance to the X Cup championship match against the Chicago Blitz. On September 10, the Empire lost to the Blitz, 19–12, in the championship match.
