= Seattle Thunder =

American women's gridiron football team

Logo

General information
- Founded: 2020 (franchise); 2022 (competition)
- Stadium: accesso ShoWare Center
- Headquartered: Kent, Washington
- Colors: Neon Green, Black
- Website: xleague.live/seattle-thunder/

Personnel
- Head coach: Chris Michaelson

League / conference affiliations
- X League

The Seattle Thunder are a women's American football team in the Extreme Football League (X League) based in Kent, Washington, in the Seattle metropolitan area.

== History ==
The Extreme Football League (X League) was announced in December 2019, as a successor to the Legends Football League (LFL). The announcement included the Thunder, a successor to the LFL's Seattle Mist. The X League's 2020 season was postponed, and the league also did not operate during 2021, amid the COVID-19 pandemic.

The Thunder first competed during the 2022 X League season, defeating the Denver Rush and losing to the Chicago Blitz during the regular season. The Thunder advanced to the X League's postseason, where they again faced Chicago and lost by a single point, 34–33, ending their season.
