= Los Angeles Black Storm =

American women's gridiron football team

Logo

General information
- Founded: 2020 (franchise); 2022 (competition)
- Stadium: Championship Soccer Stadium
- Headquartered: Irvine, California
- Colors: Neon Purple, Black
- Website: xleague.live/la-black-storm/

Personnel
- Head coach: Orlando Bishop

League / conference affiliations
- X League

The Los Angeles Black Storm are a women's American football team in the Extreme Football League (X League) based in Irvine, California, in the Los Angeles metropolitan area.

== History ==
The Extreme Football League (X League) was announced in December 2019, as a successor to the Legends Football League (LFL). The announcement included the Black Storm, a successor to the LFL's Los Angeles Temptation. The X League's 2020 season was postponed, and the league also did not operate during 2021, amid the COVID-19 pandemic.

The Black Storm first competed during the 2022 X League season. In their first game, they lost to the Austin Sound, 50–19, in an away contest. The Black Storm were scheduled to host the Arizona Red Devils in their second and final regular-season game; however, the Red Devils suspended operations for the season. The league then scheduled the "Mexico National All-Stars" as a replacement team; the Black Storm defeated them, 48–8. The Black Storm did not advance to the X League's postseason.
