= 2015–16 Austin Peay Governors basketball team =

American college basketball season

2015–16 Austin Peay Governors men's basketball

Ohio Valley Tournament champions

NCAA tournament, First Round
- Conference: Ohio Valley Conference
- West Division
- Record: 18–18 (7–9 OVC)
- Head coach: Dave Loos (26th season)
- Assistant coaches: Jay Bowen; Kevin Hogan; Julian Terrell
- Home arena: Dunn Center

2015–16 Ohio Valley Conference men's basketball standings
	Conf.				Overall
Team	W		L	PCT	W		L	PCT
East
Belmont	12	–	4	.750	20	–	12	.625
Tennessee State	11	–	5	.688	20	–	11	.645
Tennessee Tech	11	–	5	.688	19	–	12	.613
Morehead State	11	–	5	.688	23	–	14	.622
Eastern Kentucky	6	–	10	.375	15	–	16	.484
Jacksonville State	4	–	12	.250	8	–	23	.258
West
UT Martin	10	–	6	.625	20	–	15	.571
Murray State	10	–	6	.625	17	–	14	.548
Eastern Illinois	9	–	7	.563	13	–	17	.433
Austin Peay †	7	–	9	.438	18	–	18	.500
SIU Edwardsville	3	–	13	.188	6	–	22	.214
Southeast Missouri St.	2	–	14	.125	5	–	24	.172
† 2016 OVC tournament winner

The 2015–16 Austin Peay Governors basketball team represented Austin Peay State University during the 2015–16 NCAA Division I men's basketball season. The Governors, led by 26th year head coach Dave Loos, played their home games at the Dunn Center and were members of the West Division of the Ohio Valley Conference. They finished the season 18–18, 7–9 in OVC play. As an 8 seed, they defeated Tennessee Tech, Tennessee State, Belmont and UT Martin to become champions of the OVC tournament. They earned the conference's automatic bid to the NCAA tournament. As a #16 seed, they lost to Kansas in the first round.

== Previous season ==
The Governors finished the 2014–15 season 8–22, 3–13 in OVC play to finish one game out of last place. As a result, the failed to qualify of the OVC tournament.

== Roster ==
Number	Name	Position	Height	Weight	Year	Hometown
0	Terrell Thompson	Guard	6–1	180	Junior	Indianapolis
1	Assane Diop	Forward/Center	6–8	217	Junior	Dakar, Senegal
2	Jared Savage	Guard	6–5	195	Freshman	Bowling Green, Kentucky
3	Chris Porter-Bunton	Guard	6–5	217	Freshman	Bowling Green, Kentucky
4	Josh Robinson	Guard	6–2	185	Sophomore	St. Louis, Missouri
5	Chris Horton	Center/Forward	6–8	220	Senior	Decatur, Georgia
10	Tre' Ivory	Guard	5–11	185	Sophomore	Louisville, Kentucky
11	Khalil Davis	Guard	6–5	170	Senior	Kansas City, Missouri
12	Adam Pike	Guard	6–1	170	Freshman	Memphis, Tennessee
20	Domas Budrys	Guard	6–4	185	Sophomore	Kretinga, Lithuania
23	Steve Harris	Guard/Forward	6–4	180	Freshman	St. Louis, Missouri
32	John Murry	Guard/Forward	6–3	195	Junior	Indianapolis
42	Kenny Jones	Forward	6–6	180	Junior	South Bend, Indiana
45	Zach Glotta	Guard	6–0	185	Freshman	O'Fallon, Missouri

== Schedule ==
Date time, TV	Rank^{#}	Opponent^{#}	Result	Record	Site (attendance) city, state
Exhibition
11/02/2015*; 7:00 pm		Thomas More	W 85–64		Dunn Center (1,253); Clarksville, Tennessee
11/05/2015*; 7:30 pm		Sewanee	W 91–64		Dunn Center (1,111); Clarksville, Tennessee
Regular season
11/13/2015*; 7:00 pm		at No. 18 Vanderbilt; Maui Invitational	L 41–80	0–1	Memorial Gymnasium (10,116); Nashville, Tennessee
11/16/2015*; 6:00 pm, BTN		at No. 14 Indiana; Maui Invitational	L 76–102	0–2	Assembly Hall (17,472); Bloomington, Indiana
11/18/2015*; 7:00 pm		IPFW	L 77–80	0–3	Dunn Center (1,715); Clarksville, Tennessee
11/21/2015*; 3:30 pm		vs. Cal Poly; Maui Invitational	L 64–73	0–4	Bank of Colorado Arena; Greeley, Colorado
11/22/2015*; 2:30 pm		at Northern Colorado; Maui Invitational	W 91–76	1–4	Bank of Colorado Arena (1,038); Greeley, Colorado
11/25/2015*; 7:00 pm		Oakland City	W 83–55	2–4	Dunn Center (1,785); Clarksville, Tennessee
11/28/2015*; 7:00 pm		Samford	W 74–73	3–4	Dunn Center (1,343); Clarksville, Tennessee
12/02/2015*; 7:00 pm		at Texas A&M–Corpus Christi	L 48–61	3–5	American Bank Center (948); Corpus Christi, Texas
12/05/2015*; 12:00 pm		at Troy	W 80–71	4–5	Trojan Arena (1,136); Troy, Alabama
12/12/2015*; 1:30 pm		at IPFW	L 68–85	4–6	Memorial Coliseum (1,605); Fort Wayne, Indiana
12/16/2015*; 6:30 pm		at North Florida	L 70–80	4–7	UNF Arena (1,336); Jacksonville, Florida
12/20/2015*; 2:00 pm		at Lipscomb	W 92–84	5–7	Allen Arena (1,255); Nashville, Tennessee
12/22/2015*; 7:00 pm		Wofford	W 84–77	6–7	Dunn Center (1,975); Clarksville, Tennessee
12/28/2015*; 7:00 pm		Texas A&M–Corpus Christi	L 70–74	6–8	Dunn Center (1,345); Clarksville, Tennessee
12/30/2015*; 7:00 pm		Westminster (MO)	W 112–61	7–8	Dunn Center (1,203); Clarksville, Tennessee
Ohio Valley Conference regular season
01/02/2016; 7:00 pm		Eastern Kentucky	L 70–79	7–9 (0–1)	Dunn Center (1,617); Clarksville, Tennessee
01/07/2016; 7:30 pm		Jacksonville State	W 73–54	8–9 (1–1)	Dunn Center (1,297); Clarksville, Tennessee
01/09/2016; 7:00 pm		Tennessee Tech	L 66–72	8–10 (1–2)	Dunn Center (1,585); Clarksville, Tennessee
01/14/2016; 7:30 pm		at Tennessee State	L 52–66	8–11 (1–3)	Gentry Complex (1,488); Nashville, Tennessee
01/16/2016; 7:00 pm		at Belmont	L 58–76	8–12 (1–4)	Curb Event Center (2,407); Nashville, Tennessee
01/21/2016; 7:00 pm		SIU Edwardsville	W 90–86 ^{OT}	9–12 (2–4)	Dunn Center (1,365); Clarksville, Tennessee
01/23/2016; 7:00 pm		Eastern Illinois	L 86–87	9–13 (2–5)	Dunn Center (2,467); Clarksville, Tennessee
01/27/2016; 6:45 pm		at Morehead State	L 65–75	9–14 (2–6)	Ellis Johnson Arena (2,765); Morehead, Kentucky
01/30/2016; 4:15 pm		at Southeast Missouri State	W 86–80	10–14 (3–6)	Show Me Center; Cape Girardeau, Missouri
02/04/2016; 6:00 pm		at UT Martin	L 77–86	10–15 (3–7)	Skyhawk Arena (1,626); Martin, Tennessee
02/06/2016; 7:00 pm		at Murray State	W 76–73	11–15 (4–7)	CFSB Center (4,501); Murray, Kentucky
02/10/2016; 8:00 pm, ASN		at Eastern Illinois	W 79–70	12–15 (5–7)	Lantz Arena (1,771); Charleston, Illinois
02/13/2016; 7:30 pm		UT Martin	L 84–85 ^{OT}	12–16 (5–8)	Dunn Center (2,599); Clarksville, Tennessee
02/20/2016; 7:00 pm		Murray State	L 60–76	12–17 (5–9)	Dunn Center (5,419); Clarksville, Tennessee
02/25/2016; 7:00 pm		at SIU Edwardsville	W 80–75	13–17 (6–9)	Vadalabene Center (1,647); Edwardsville, Illinois
02/27/2016; 7:00 pm		Southeast Missouri State	W 83–75	14–17 (7–9)	Dunn Center (3,109); Clarksville, Tennessee
Ohio Valley Conference tournament
03/02/2016; 6:00 pm	(8)	vs. (5) Tennessee Tech; First Round	W 92–72	15–17	Nashville Municipal Auditorium (1,122); Nashville, Tennessee
03/03/2016; 6:00 pm	(8)	vs. (4) Tennessee State; Quarterfinals	W 74–72	16–17	Nashville Municipal Auditorium (1,545); Nashville, Tennessee
03/04/2016; 6:30 pm, ESPNU	(8)	vs. (1) Belmont; Semifinals	W 97–96 ^{OT}	17–17	Nashville Municipal Auditorium (2,167); Nashville, Tennessee
03/05/2016; 5:00 pm, ESPN2	(8)	vs. (2) UT Martin; Championship	W 83–73	18–17	Nashville Municipal Auditorium (2,068); Nashville, Tennessee
NCAA tournament
03/17/16*; 3:00 pm, TNT	(16 S)	vs. (1 S) No. 1 Kansas; First Round	L 79–105	18–18	Wells Fargo Arena (16,628); Des Moines, Iowa
*Non-conference game. ^{#}Rankings from AP Poll. (#) Tournament seedings in parentheses. S=South Region. All times are in Central Time.
