= 2015–16 Eastern Illinois Panthers men's basketball team =

American college basketball season

2015–16 Eastern Illinois Panthers men's basketball
- Conference: Ohio Valley Conference
- West Division
- Record: 13–17 (9–7 OVC)
- Head coach: Jay Spoonhour (4th season)
- Assistant coaches: Rand Chappell; J.R. Renolds; Marc Stricker
- Home arena: Lantz Arena

2015–16 Ohio Valley Conference men's basketball standings
	Conf.				Overall
Team	W		L	PCT	W		L	PCT
East
Belmont	12	–	4	.750	20	–	12	.625
Tennessee State	11	–	5	.688	20	–	11	.645
Tennessee Tech	11	–	5	.688	19	–	12	.613
Morehead State	11	–	5	.688	23	–	14	.622
Eastern Kentucky	6	–	10	.375	15	–	16	.484
Jacksonville State	4	–	12	.250	8	–	23	.258
West
UT Martin	10	–	6	.625	20	–	15	.571
Murray State	10	–	6	.625	17	–	14	.548
Eastern Illinois	9	–	7	.563	13	–	17	.433
Austin Peay †	7	–	9	.438	18	–	18	.500
SIU Edwardsville	3	–	13	.188	6	–	22	.214
Southeast Missouri St.	2	–	14	.125	5	–	24	.172
† 2016 OVC tournament winner

The 2015–16 Eastern Illinois Panthers men's basketball team represented Eastern Illinois University during the 2015–16 NCAA Division I men's basketball season. The Panthers, led by fourth-year head coach Jay Spoonhour, played their home games at Lantz Arena and were members of the West division of the Ohio Valley Conference. They finished the season 13–17, 9–7 in OVC play, to finish in third place in the West division. They lost in the first round of the OVC tournament to Murray State.

== Previous season ==
The Panthers finished the 2014–15 season 18–15, 9–7 in OVC play, to finish in third place in the West division. They advanced to the quarterfinals of the OVC tournament where they lost to Belmont. They were invited to the CollegeInsider.com Tournament where they defeated Oakland in the first round before losing in the second round to Evansville.

== Roster ==
Number	Name	Position	Height	Weight	Year	Hometown
1	Demetrius McReynolds	Guard	6'2"	210	Junior	Louisville, KY
2	Cornell Johnson	Guard	5'7"	150	Sophomore	St. Louis, MO
3	Casey Teson	Guard	6'2"	190	Freshman	St. Charles, MO
5	A. J. Riley	Guard	6'4"	225	Junior	Peoria, IL
10	Luke Norman	Guard	6'1"	185	Senior	The Bronx, NY
11	Anthony Johnson	Guard	6'4"	200	Junior	Oblong, IL
12	Marshawn Blackmon	Guard/forward	6'5"	200	Freshman	St. Peters, MO
15	Trae Anderson	Guard/forward	6'5"	235	Senior	St. Louis, MO
24	Joe Kuligoski	Forward	6'6"	220	RS'Senior	Orland Park, IL
30	Aleksa Novaković	Guard/forward	6'7"	225	Freshman	Belgrade, Serbia
32	Patrick Muldoon	Forward	6'7"	215	Freshman	Basehor, KS
33	Luke Piotrowski	Forward	6'11"	250	RS Senior	Port Republic, NJ
35	Chris Olivier	Forward	6'8"	245	Junior	Chicago, IL
41	Lucas Jones	Forward	6'8"	205	Freshman	Prairie Village, KS
54	Justin Earls	Forward	6'7"	220	RS Sophomore	Chicago, IL
55	Aboubacar Diallo	Forward	6'9"	200	Freshman	Abidjan, Ivory Coast

== Schedule ==
Date time, TV	Opponent	Result	Record	Site (attendance) city, state
Exhibition
November 3, 2015*; 7:00 p.m.	St. Francis (IL)	W 74–71		Lantz Arena (868); Charleston, IL
Regular season
November 13, 2015*; 6:00 p.m.	at No. 15 Indiana	L 49–88	0–1	Assembly Hall (17,472); Bloomington, IN
November 16, 2015*; 6:00 p.m., ESPN3	at Ball State	L 56–73	0–2	John E. Worthen Arena (2,864); Muncie, IN
November 21, 2015*; 7:00 p.m.	Western Illinois	L 63–83	0–3	Lantz Arena (869); Charleston, IL
November 28, 2015*; 7:00 p.m.	Green Bay	L 72–81	0–4	Lantz Arena (410); Charleston, IL
December 1, 2015*; 7:00 p.m.	Indiana State	W 68–62	1–4	Lantz Arena (1,183); Charleston, IL
December 7, 2015*; 7:00 p.m.	Northern Kentucky	W 79–73	2–4	Lantz Arena (1,021); Charleston, IL
December 9, 2015*; 6:00 p.m.	at Marshall; Global Sports Classic	L 76–82	2–5	Cam Henderson Center (4,391); Huntington, WV
December 12, 2015*; 6:00 p.m., ESPN3	Western Illinois	L 57–64	2–6	Lantz Arena (1,231); Charleston, IL
December 19, 2015*; 3:00 p.m., ESPN3	at Houston; Global Sports Classic	L 65–81	2–7	Hofheinz Pavilion (3,428); Houston, TX
December 21, 2015*; 1:00 p.m.	vs. Nebraska–Omaha; Global Sports Classic	L 68–80	2–8	Cox Pavilion; Paradise, NV
December 22, 2015*; 1:00 p.m.	vs. North Carolina Central; Global Sports Classic	L 52–57	2–9	Cox Pavilion; Paradise, NV
December 28, 2015*; 7:00 p.m.	Hannibal–LaGrange	W 78–53	3–9	Lantz Arena (444); Charleston, IL
December 31, 2015; 3:00 p.m.	at Tennessee Tech	L 84–94	3–10 (0–1)	Eblen Center (1,272); Cookeville, TN
January 2, 2016; 4:30 p.m.	at Jacksonville State	W 75–64	4–10 (1–1)	Pete Mathews Coliseum (692); Jacksonville, AL
January 6, 2016; 7:00 p.m.	Tennessee State	L 61–66	4–11 (1–2)	Lantz Arena (716); Charleston, IL
January 9, 2016; 2:00 p.m.	at Belmont	L 59–85	4–12 (1–3)	Curb Event Center (2,054); Nashville, TN
January 14, 2016; 8:00 p.m., CBSSN	Eastern Kentucky	W 97–85	5–12 (2–3)	Lantz Arena (1,277); Charleston, IL
January 16, 2016; 3:15 p.m.	Morehead State	W 84–82 ^{OT}	6–12 (3–3)	Lantz Arena (1,369); Charleston, IL
January 21, 2016; 7:00 p.m.	at Murray State	L 58–68	6–13 (3–4)	CFSB Center (2,328); Murray, KY
January 23, 2016; 7:00 p.m.	at Austin Peay	W 87–86 ^{OT}	7–13 (4–4)	Dunn Center (2,467); Clarksville, TN
January 28, 2016; 7:00 p.m.	Tennessee–Martin	W 82–74	8–13 (5–4)	Lantz Arena (1,339); Charleston, IL
January 30, 2016; 5:00 p.m.	at SIU Edwardsville	W 60–46	9–13 (6–4)	Vadalabene Center (2,008); Edwardsville, IL
February 1, 2016*; 7:00 p.m.	St. Ambrose	W 101–59	10–13	Lantz Arena (713); Charleston, IL
February 6, 2016; 11:00 a.m., ASN	Southeast Missouri State	W 78–69	11–13 (7–4)	Lantz Arena (1,317); Charleston, IL
February 10, 2016; 8:00 p.m., ASN	Austin Peay	L 70–79	11–14 (7–5)	Lantz Arena (1,771); Charleston, IL
February 13, 2016; 7:00 p.m.	SIU Edwardsville	L 64–72	11–15 (7–6)	Lantz Arena (1,469); Charleston, IL
February 18, 2016; 6:00 p.m.	at Tennessee–Martin	L 84–87 ^{OT}	11–16 (7–7)	Skyhawk Arena (1,709); Martin, TN
February 20, 2016; 4:00 p.m.	at Southeast Missouri State	W 71–68	12–16 (8–7)	Show Me Center (2,142); Cape Girardeau, MO
February 25, 2016; 8:30 p.m., CBSSN	Murray State	W 85–74	13–16 (9–7)	Lantz Arena (2,023); Charleston, IL
Ohio Valley tournament
March 2, 2016; 8:00 p.m.	vs. Murray State; First round	L 62–78	13–17	Nashville Municipal Auditorium (1,122); Nashville, TN
*Non-conference game. ^{#}Rankings from AP poll. (#) Tournament seedings in parentheses. All times are in Central.
