= 2015–16 Belmont Bruins men's basketball team =

American college basketball season

2015–16 Belmont Bruins men's basketball

OVC regular season champions OVC East Division champions

NIT, First Round
- Conference: Ohio Valley Conference
- East Division
- Record: 20–12 (12–4 OVC)
- Head coach: Rick Byrd (30th season)
- Assistant coaches: Brian Ayers; James Strong; Mark Price
- Home arena: Curb Event Center

2015–16 Ohio Valley Conference men's basketball standings
	Conf.				Overall
Team	W		L	PCT	W		L	PCT
East
Belmont	12	–	4	.750	20	–	12	.625
Tennessee State	11	–	5	.688	20	–	11	.645
Tennessee Tech	11	–	5	.688	19	–	12	.613
Morehead State	11	–	5	.688	23	–	14	.622
Eastern Kentucky	6	–	10	.375	15	–	16	.484
Jacksonville State	4	–	12	.250	8	–	23	.258
West
UT Martin	10	–	6	.625	20	–	15	.571
Murray State	10	–	6	.625	17	–	14	.548
Eastern Illinois	9	–	7	.563	13	–	17	.433
Austin Peay †	7	–	9	.438	18	–	18	.500
SIU Edwardsville	3	–	13	.188	6	–	22	.214
Southeast Missouri St.	2	–	14	.125	5	–	24	.172
† 2016 OVC tournament winner

The 2015–16 Belmont Bruins men's basketball team represented Belmont University during the 2015–16 NCAA Division I men's basketball season. The Bruins, led by 30th year head coach Rick Byrd, played their home games at the Curb Event Center and were members of the Ohio Valley Conference in the East Division. They finished the season 20–12, 12–4 in OVC play to be champions of the East Division and overall OVC regular season champions. They lost in the semifinals of the OVC tournament to Austin Peay. As a regular season conference champion who failed to win their conference tournament, they received an automatic bid to the National Invitation Tournament where they lost in the first round to Georgia.

== Roster ==
2015–16 Belmont Bruins men's basketball team
Players
Coaches

Pos.	#	Name	Height	Weight	Year	Hometown
G/F	0	Alex Martin (W)	6 ft 6 in (1.98 m)	185 lb (84 kg)	RS Fr	Overland Park, Kansas
G	1	Austin Luke	6 ft 3 in (1.91 m)	200 lb (91 kg)	RS So	Rowlett, Texas
F	2	Nick Smith	6 ft 8 in (2.03 m)	220 lb (100 kg)	Jr	Bentonville, Arkansas
G/F	3	Dylan Windler	6 ft 7 in (2.01 m)	180 lb (82 kg)	Fr	Indianapolis, Indiana
F	5	Jeff Laidig	6 ft 4 in (1.93 m)	210 lb (95 kg)	Sr	Mishawaka, Indiana
G	20	Taylor Barnette	6 ft 3 in (1.91 m)	185 lb (84 kg)	Jr	Lexington, Kentucky
G	21	Burton Sampson (W)	6 ft 4 in (1.93 m)	195 lb (88 kg)	RS So	Knoxville, Tennessee
G	23	Craig Bradshaw	6 ft 3 in (1.91 m)	210 lb (95 kg)	Sr	Ridgetop, Tennessee
G	24	Micahel Benkert	6 ft 4 in (1.93 m)	195 lb (88 kg)	Fr	Greenwood, Indiana
F	25	Mack Mercer	6 ft 9 in (2.06 m)	225 lb (102 kg)	So	Plymouth, Indiana
G	30	Kevin McClain	6 ft 2 in (1.88 m)	180 lb (82 kg)	Fr	Jennings, Florida
F	31	Josh Lester (W)	6 ft 6 in (1.98 m)	225 lb (102 kg)	RS So	Antioch, Tennessee
F	32	Amanze Egekeze	6 ft 8 in (2.03 m)	220 lb (100 kg)	So	Lake in the Hills, Illinois
F	35	Evan Bradds	6 ft 7 in (2.01 m)	205 lb (93 kg)	RS Jr	Jamestown, Ohio
C	41	Tyler Hadden	6 ft 10 in (2.08 m)	240 lb (109 kg)	RS So	Cincinnati, Ohio
C	50	Seth Adelsperger	6 ft 11 in (2.11 m)	215 lb (98 kg)	Fr	Peru, Indiana

Head coach

- Rick Byrd (Tennessee)

Assistant coach(es)

- Brian Ayers (Lipscomb)
- James Strong (Vanderbilt)
- Mark Price (Samford)

Legend

- (C) Team captain
- (S) Suspended
- (I) Ineligible
- (W) Walk-on
- Injured
- Current redshirt

Roster

== Schedule ==
Date time, TV	Rank^{#}	Opponent^{#}	Result	Record	Site (attendance) city, state
Non-conference regular season
11/13/2015*; 8:00 pm, FSN		at Marquette; Legends Classic	W 83–80	1–0	BMO Harris Bradley Center (12,628); Milwaukee, WI
11/16/2015*; 9:00 pm, P12N		at Arizona State; Legends Classic	L 74–83	1–1	Wells Fargo Arena (4,549); Tempe, AZ
11/18/2015*; 6:00 pm, ASN		WKU	W 90–85	2–1	Curb Event Center (3,253); Nashville, TN
11/21/2015*; 12:00 pm, ESPN3		at Evansville	L 88–93	2–2	Ford Center (4,227); Evansville, TN
11/23/2015*; 3:00 pm		vs. South Alabama; Legends Classic	W 98–85	3–2	KSU Convocation Center (1,262); Kennesaw, GA
11/24/2015*; 5:30 pm		at Kennesaw State; Legends Classic	W 80–55	4–2	KSU Convocation Center (812); Kennesaw, GA
11/28/2015*; 8:00 pm, BYUtv		at BYU	L 81–95	4–3	Marriott Center (13,712); Provo, UT
12/01/2015*; 7:00 pm		Lipscomb; Battle of the Boulevard	W 105–89	5–3	Curb Event Center (3,094); Nashville, TN
12/03/2015*; 7:00 pm		at Valparaiso	L 57–61	5–4	Athletics–Recreation Center (3,379); Valparaiso, IN
12/07/2015*; 6:30 pm, ESPN3		at Lipscomb; Battle of the Boulevard	W 93–84	6–4	Allen Arena (4,420); Nashville, TN
12/15/2015*; 7:00 pm		Ouachita Baptist	W 80–54	7–4	Curb Event Center (1,124); Nashville, TN
12/17/2015*; 6:00 pm, ASN		at Middle Tennessee	L 62–83	7–5	Murphy Center (5,555); Murfreesboro, TN
12/19/2015*; 6:00 pm, ESPN3		at Cleveland State	L 75–77	7–6	Wolstein Center; Clelveland, OH
12/28/2015*; 7:00 pm		Valparaiso	W 85–81	8–6	Curb Event Center (3,024); Nashville, TN
Ohio Valley Conference regular season
12/31/2015; 12:00 pm		at Southeast Missouri State	W 92–82	9–6 (1–0)	Show Me Center (1,135); Cape Giraradeau, MO
01/06/2016; 7:00 pm, ASN		at SIU Edwardsville	W 85–77	10–6 (2–0)	Vadalabene Center (1,007); Edwardsville, IL
01/09/2016; 2:00 pm		Eastern Illinois	W 85–59	11–6 (3–0)	Curb Event Center (2,054); Nashville, TN
01/14/2016; 8:00 pm, ESPNU		Murray State	W 81–73	12–6 (4–0)	Curb Event Center (2,522); Nashville, TN
01/16/2016; 7:00 pm		Austin Peay	W 76–58	13–6 (5–0)	Curb Event Center (2,407); Nashville, TN
01/21/2016; 7:00 pm, ESPNU		at Tennessee–Martin	W 82–72	14–6 (6–0)	Skyhawk Arena (3,598); Martin, TN
01/23/2016; 7:00 pm		Tennessee State	W 103–95	15–6 (7–0)	Curb Event Center (2,213); Nashville, TN
01/28/2016; 7:00 pm		at Jacksonville State	W 72–63	16–6 (8–0)	Pete Mathews Coliseum (2,488); Jacksonville, AL
01/30/2016; 7:00 pm		at Tennessee Tech	L 79–89	16–7 (8–1)	Eblen Center (4,428); Cookeville, TN
02/04/2016; 7:00 pm		Morehead State	W 73–67	17–7 (9–1)	Curb Event Center (1,559); Nashville, TN
02/06/2016; 5:00 pm		Eastern Kentucky	L 78–88	17–8 (9–2)	Curb Event Center (2,286); Nashville, TN
02/10/2016; 7:30 pm		Jacksonville State	W 81–73	18–8 (10–2)	Curb Event Center (1,828); Nashville, TN
02/13/2016; 11:00 am, CBSSN		at Morehead State	L 77–78	18–9 (10–3)	Ellis Johnson Arena (3,845); Morehead, KY
02/18/2016; 8:00 pm, ESPNU		at Eastern Kentucky	W 86–78	19–9 (11–3)	McBrayer Arena (4,200); Richmond, KY
02/20/2016; 5:00 pm		Tennessee Tech	W 95–86	20–9 (12–3)	Curb Event Center (5,074); Nashville, TN
02/28/2016; 2:30 pm		at Tennessee State	L 72–87	20–10 (12–4)	Gentry Complex (6,845); Nashville, TN
Ohio Valley Conference tournament
03/04/2016; 6:30 pm, ESPNU	(1)	vs. (8) Austin Peay; Semifinals	L 96–97 ^{OT}	20–11	Nashville Municipal Auditorium (2,167); Nashville, TN
National Invitation tournament
03/16/2016*; 6:00 pm, ESPN2	(6)	at (3) Georgia; First Round – Valparaiso Bracket	L 84–93	20–12	Stegeman Coliseum (2,965); Athens, GA
*Non-conference game. ^{#}Rankings from AP Poll. (#) Tournament seedings in parentheses. All times are in Central Time.
