= 2015–16 Murray State Racers men's basketball team =

American college basketball season

2015–16 Murray State Racers men's basketball
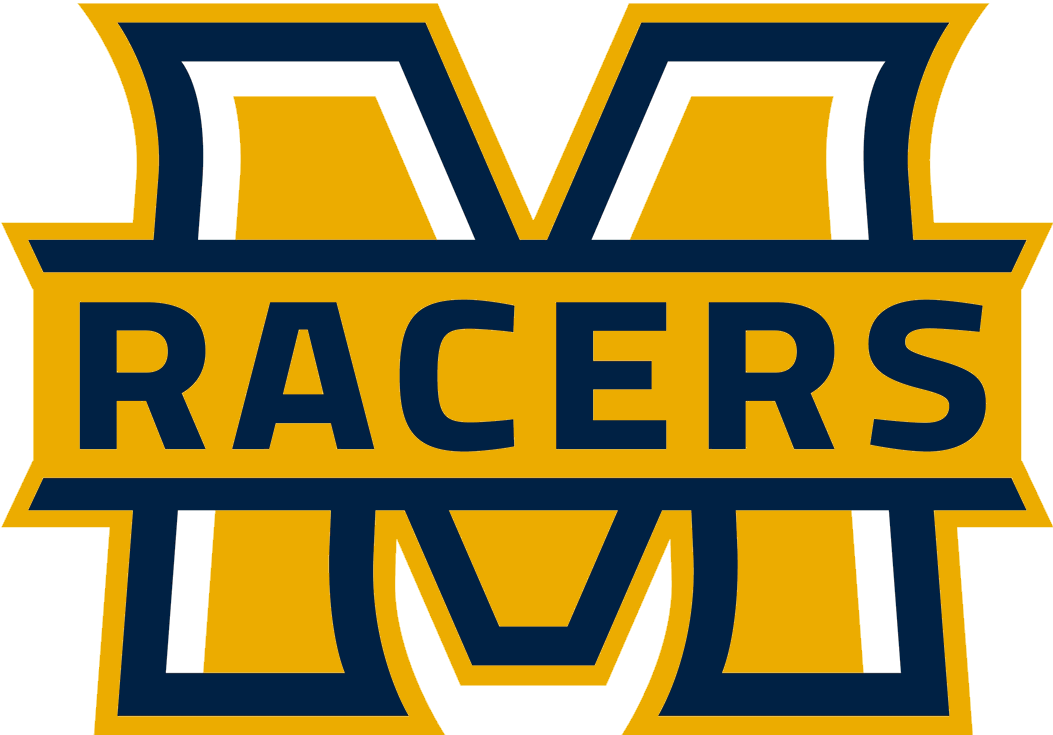

OVC West Division co–champions
- Conference: Ohio Valley Conference
- West Division
- Record: 17–14 (10–6 OVC)
- Head coach: Matt McMahon (1st season)
- Assistant coaches: James Kane; Tim Kaine; Shane Nichols
- Home arena: CFSB Center

2015–16 Ohio Valley Conference men's basketball standings
	Conf.				Overall
Team	W		L	PCT	W		L	PCT
East
Belmont	12	–	4	.750	20	–	12	.625
Tennessee State	11	–	5	.688	20	–	11	.645
Tennessee Tech	11	–	5	.688	19	–	12	.613
Morehead State	11	–	5	.688	23	–	14	.622
Eastern Kentucky	6	–	10	.375	15	–	16	.484
Jacksonville State	4	–	12	.250	8	–	23	.258
West
UT Martin	10	–	6	.625	20	–	15	.571
Murray State	10	–	6	.625	17	–	14	.548
Eastern Illinois	9	–	7	.563	13	–	17	.433
Austin Peay †	7	–	9	.438	18	–	18	.500
SIU Edwardsville	3	–	13	.188	6	–	22	.214
Southeast Missouri St.	2	–	14	.125	5	–	24	.172
† 2016 OVC tournament winner

The 2015–16 Murray State Racers men's basketball team represented Murray State University during the 2015–16 NCAA Division I men's basketball season. The Racers, led by first year head coach Matt McMahon, played their home games at the CFSB Center and were members of the West Division of the Ohio Valley Conference. They finished the season 17–14, 10–6 in OVC play to finish in a tie for the West Division title. They defeated Eastern Illinois in the first round of the OVC tournament to advance to the quarterfinals where they lost to Morehead State.

== Roster ==
2015–16 Murray State Racers men's basketball team
Players
Coaches

Pos.	#	Name	Height	Weight	Year	Previous school	Hometown
F	0	Wayne Langston	6 ft 7 in (2.01 m)	245 lb (111 kg)	Jr	Dr. Henry A. Wise; McLennan CC	Upper Marlboro, Maryland
G	1	Bryce Jones	6 ft 0 in (1.83 m)	170 lb (77 kg)	Jr	Boys and Girls; Jones County CC	Brooklyn, New York
F	2	Jeffery Moss	6 ft 4 in (1.93 m)	190 lb (86 kg)	Sr	Bob Jones	Madison, Alabama
F	4	Brion Sanchious	6 ft 8 in (2.03 m)	230 lb (104 kg)	Fr	Northeast	Pompano Beach, Florida
G	10	Chad Culbreath	5 ft 9 in (1.75 m)	165 lb (75 kg)	Fr	Ripley	Henning, Tennessee
G	11	Damarcus Croaker	6 ft 4 in (1.93 m)	190 lb (86 kg)	Jr	Jones; Texas	Orlando, Florida
F	12	Gee McGhee	6 ft 5 in (1.96 m)	225 lb (102 kg)	Jr	Redemptorist; Chattanooga	Baton Rouge, Louisiana
F	13	Charles Brown	6 ft 6 in (1.98 m)	210 lb (95 kg)	Fr	St. Augustine; Tulane	New Orleans
G	14	Jonathan Stark	6 ft 0 in (1.83 m)	170 lb (77 kg)	Jr	Munford; Tulane	Munford, Tennessee
G	23	Justin Seymour	6 ft 3 in (1.91 m)	215 lb (98 kg)	RS Jr	Wheeler; Utah	Atlanta
G	24	Kedrick Flomo	6 ft 1 in (1.85 m)	185 lb (84 kg)	So	North Forsyth	Winston-Salem, North Carolina
F	32	A.J. Patty	6 ft 9 in (2.06 m)	215 lb (98 kg)	Jr	St. Joseph; Vincennes JC	Westchester, Illinois
F	34	Terron Gilmore	6 ft 7 in (2.01 m)	230 lb (104 kg)	Sr	Callaway	Jackson, Mississippi

Head coach

- Matt McMahon (Appalachian State)

Assistant coach(es)

- James Kane (Florida)
- Tim Kaine (Winthrop)
- Shane Nichols (Wofford)

Legend

- (C) Team captain
- (S) Suspended
- (I) Ineligible
- (W) Walk-on
- Injured
- Current redshirt

Roster
Last update: 11-5-15

== Schedule ==
Date time, TV	Opponent	Result	Record	Site (attendance) city, state
Exhibition
11/05/2015*; 7:00 pm	Freed–Hardeman	L 85–87 ^{OT}		CFSB Center; Murray, Kentucky
Non-conference regular season
11/13/2015*; 7:00 pm	Harris–Stowe State	W 105–55	1–0	CFSB Center (2,691); Murray, Kentucky
11/17/2015*; 7:00 pm, ASN	Middle Tennessee	W 76–65	2–0	CFSB Center (3,070); Murray, Kentucky
11/20/2015*; 6:00 pm	at Georgia	L 52–63	2–1	Stegeman Coliseum (5,982); Athens, Georgia
11/23/2015*; 11:00 am	vs. Milwaukee; Gulf Coast Showcase quarterfinals	W 66–63	3–1	Germain Arena (523); Estero, Florida
11/24/2015*; 6:00 pm	vs. Pepperdine; Gulf Coast Showcase semifinals	W 59–55	4–1	Germain Arena (823); Estero, Florida
11/25/2015*; 5:30 pm	vs. Weber State; Gulf Coast Showcase championship	L 59–75	4–2	Germain Arena (1,102); Estero, Florida
11/28/2015*; 7:00 pm	Alabama A&M	W 63–61	5–2	CFSB Center (2,356); Murray, Kentucky
12/02/2015*; 7:00 pm, ESPN3	at Houston	L 78–93	5–3	Hofheinz Pavilion (2,089); Houston
12/05/2015*; 7:00 pm	Evansville	L 81–85 ^{OT}	5–4	CFSB Center (3,174); Murray, Kentucky
12/13/2015*; 3:00 pm	at Illinois State	L 61–63	5–5	Redbird Arena (4,239); Normal, Illinois
12/18/2015*; 7:00 pm	Southern Illinois	L 73–88	5–6	CFSB Center (3,784); Murray, Kentucky
12/22/2015*; 6:00 pm	at Wright State	L 49–65	5–7	Nutter Center (3,708); Fairborn, Ohio
12/30/2015*; 7:00 pm	Brescia	W 101–75	6–7	CFSB Center (2,462); Murray, Kentucky
Ohio Valley Conference regular season
01/02/2016; 2:00 pm, CBSSN	Morehead State	W 62–57	7–7 (1–0)	CFSB Center (3,125); Murray, Kentucky
01/07/2016; 7:00 pm	Tennessee Tech	L 65–71	7–8 (1–1)	CFSB Center (3,063); Murray, Kentucky
01/09/2016; 5:30 pm, CBSSN	Jacksonville State	W 69–54	8–8 (2–1)	CFSB Center (3,191); Murray, Kentucky
01/14/2016; 8:00 pm, ESPNU	at Belmont	L 73–81	8–9 (2–2)	Curb Event Center (2,522); Nashville, Tennessee
01/16/2016; 7:30 pm	at Tennessee State	L 71–73	8–10 (2–3)	Gentry Complex (2,246); Nashville, Tennessee
01/21/2016; 7:00 pm	Eastern Illinois	W 68–58	9–10 (3–3)	CFSB Center (2,328); Murray, Kentucky
01/23/2016; 7:00 pm	SIU Edwardsville	W 70–54	10–10 (4–3)	CFSB Center (3,011); Murray, Kentucky
01/27/2016; 7:00 pm	at Eastern Kentucky	W 75–71	11–10 (5–3)	McBrayer Arena (2,700); Richmond, Kentucky
01/30/2016; 3:00 pm, CBSSN	at UT Martin	L 59–63	11–11 (5–4)	Skyhawk Arena (3,407); Martin, Tennessee
02/04/2016; 8:00 pm, ESPNU	at Southeast Missouri State	W 78–72	12–11 (6–4)	Show Me Center (2,332); Cape Girardeau, Missouri
02/06/2016; 7:00 pm	Austin Peay	L 73–76	12–12 (6–5)	CFSB Center (4,501); Murray, Kentucky
02/11/2016; 7:00 pm	at SIU Edwardsville	W 70–64	13–12 (7–5)	Vadalabene Center (2,007); Edwardsville, Illinois
02/13/2016; 7:00 pm	Southeast Missouri State	W 83–56	14–12 (8–5)	CFSB Center (3,569); Murray, Kentucky
02/20/2016; 7:00 pm	at Austin Peay	W 76–60	15–12 (9–5)	Dunn Center (5,419); Clarksville, Tennessee
02/25/2016; 8:30 pm, CBSSN	at Eastern Illinois	L 74–85	15–13 (9–6)	Lantz Arena (2,023); Charleston, Illinois
02/27/2016; 7:00 pm	UT Martin	W 79–55	16–13 (10–6)	CFSB Center (5,412); Murray, Kentucky
Ohio Valley Conference tournament
03/02/2016; 8:00 pm	vs. Eastern Illinois; First round	W 78–62	17–13	Nashville Municipal Auditorium (1,122); Nashville, Tennessee
03/03/2016; 8:00 pm	vs. Morehead State; Quarterfinals	L 66–75	17–14	Nashville Municipal Auditorium (1,545); Nashville, Tennessee
*Non-conference game. (#) Tournament seedings in parentheses. All times are in Central Time.
