= 2016 Ohio Valley Conference men's basketball tournament =

- Classification: Division I
- Season: 2015–16
- Teams: 8
- Site: Nashville Municipal Auditorium; Nashville, Tennessee
- Champions: Austin Peay (5th title)
- Winning coach: Dave Loos (4th title)
- MVP: Chris Horton (Austin Peay)
- Television: OVCDN/ESPN3, ESPNU, ESPN2

2015–16 Ohio Valley Conference men's basketball standings
	Conf.				Overall
Team	W		L	PCT	W		L	PCT
East
Belmont	12	–	4	.750	20	–	12	.625
Tennessee State	11	–	5	.688	20	–	11	.645
Tennessee Tech	11	–	5	.688	19	–	12	.613
Morehead State	11	–	5	.688	23	–	14	.622
Eastern Kentucky	6	–	10	.375	15	–	16	.484
Jacksonville State	4	–	12	.250	8	–	23	.258
West
UT Martin	10	–	6	.625	20	–	15	.571
Murray State	10	–	6	.625	17	–	14	.548
Eastern Illinois	9	–	7	.563	13	–	17	.433
Austin Peay †	7	–	9	.438	18	–	18	.500
SIU Edwardsville	3	–	13	.188	6	–	22	.214
Southeast Missouri St.	2	–	14	.125	5	–	24	.172
† 2016 OVC tournament winner

The 2016 Ohio Valley Conference men's basketball tournament was held March 2–5 at Nashville Municipal Auditorium in Nashville, Tennessee. Austin Peay, the #8 seed, won the tournament and earned the conference's automatic bid to the NCAA tournament. Due to the locale of the tournament, it was dubbed as Music City Madness.

== Seeds ==
Only the top eight teams in the conference qualified for the Tournament. The #1 and #2 seeds received double byes to the semifinals under the merit-based format. The #3 and #4 seeds received a single bye to the quarterfinals. The #1 and #2 seeds went to the division champions.

Teams were seeded by record within the division and conference, with a tiebreaker system to seed teams with identical conference records.

Seed	School	Conference	Tiebreaker
1	Belmont	12–4	
2	Tennessee–Martin	10–6	1–1 vs. Murray State, 2–0 vs. Austin Peay
3	Morehead State	11–5	1–1 vs. Tennessee State, 2–0 vs. Tennessee Tech
4	Tennessee State	11–5	1–1 vs. Tennessee Tech, 1–1 vs. Morehead State
5	Tennessee Tech	11–5	0–2 vs. Morehead State, 1–1 vs. Tennessee State
6	Murray State	10–6	1–1 vs. Tennessee–Martin, 1–1 vs. Austin Peay
7	Eastern Illinois	9–7	
8	Austin Peay	7–9	

== Schedule ==
Game	Time	Matchup	Final score	Television
First Round – Wednesday, March 2
1	6:00 pm	#5 Tennessee Tech vs. #8 Austin Peay	72–92	OVC Digital Network
2	8:00 pm	#6 Murray State vs. #7 Eastern Illinois	78–62	OVC Digital Network
Second Round – Thursday, March 3
3	6:00 pm	#4 Tennessee State vs. #8 Austin Peay	72–74	OVC Digital Network
4	8:00 pm	#3 Morehead State vs. #6 Murray State	75–66	OVC Digital Network
Semifinals – Friday, March 4
5	6:30 pm	#1 Belmont vs. #8 Austin Peay	96–97^{OT}	ESPNU
6	8:30 pm	#2 Tennessee–Martin vs. #3 Morehead State	83–70	ESPNU
Championship – Saturday, March 5
7	7:00 pm	#2 Tennessee–Martin vs. #8 Austin Peay	73–83	ESPN2
All game times in Eastern Time Zone.

== Bracket ==
First round Wednesday, March 2 OVCDN
5	Tennessee Tech	72
8	Austin Peay	92
6	Murray State	78
7	Eastern Illinois	62

Quarterfinals; Thursday, March 3 OVCDN
4	Tennessee State	72
8	Austin Peay	74
3	Morehead State	75
6	Murray State	66

Semifinals; Friday, March 4 ESPNU
1	Belmont	96
8	Austin Peay	97^{OT}
2	Tennessee–Martin	83
3	Morehead State	70

Championship; Saturday, March 5 ESPN2
8	Austin Peay	83
2	Tennessee–Martin	73

== See also ==
- 2016 Ohio Valley Conference women's basketball tournament
