= 2015–16 Jacksonville State Gamecocks men's basketball team =

American college basketball season

2015–16 Jacksonville State Gamecocks men's basketball
- Conference: Ohio Valley Conference
- East Division
- Record: 8–23 (4–12 OVC)
- Head coach: James Green (8th season)
- Assistant coach: Reggie Sharp; Ronnie Dean
- Home arena: Pete Mathews Coliseum

2015–16 Ohio Valley Conference men's basketball standings
	Conf.				Overall
Team	W		L	PCT	W		L	PCT
East
Belmont	12	–	4	.750	20	–	12	.625
Tennessee State	11	–	5	.688	20	–	11	.645
Tennessee Tech	11	–	5	.688	19	–	12	.613
Morehead State	11	–	5	.688	23	–	14	.622
Eastern Kentucky	6	–	10	.375	15	–	16	.484
Jacksonville State	4	–	12	.250	8	–	23	.258
West
UT Martin	10	–	6	.625	20	–	15	.571
Murray State	10	–	6	.625	17	–	14	.548
Eastern Illinois	9	–	7	.563	13	–	17	.433
Austin Peay †	7	–	9	.438	18	–	18	.500
SIU Edwardsville	3	–	13	.188	6	–	22	.214
Southeast Missouri St.	2	–	14	.125	5	–	24	.172
† 2016 OVC tournament winner

The 2015–16 Jacksonville State Gamecocks men's basketball team represented Jacksonville State University during the 2015–16 NCAA Division I men's basketball season. The Gamecocks, led by eighth-year head coach James Green, played their home games at the Pete Mathews Coliseum and were members of the East Division of the Ohio Valley Conference. They finished the season 8–23, 4–12 in OVC play to finish in last place in the East Division. They failed to qualify for the OVC tournament.

On March 16, Jacksonville State and head coach James Green mutually agreed to part ways. He finished at Jacksonville State with an eight-year record of 89–153. On April 6, 2016, the school hired Ray Harper as head coach.

== Roster ==
Number	Name	Position	Height	Weight	Year	Hometown
0	DelFincko Bogan	Guard	5–9	194	Freshman	Charleston, Missouri
1	Greg Tucker	Guard	6–2	195	Junior	Charleston, Missouri
2	JaQuail Townser	Guard	6–3	195	Senior	Alton, Illinois
3	Cam Biedscheid	Guard/forward	6–7	198	Junior	St. Louis, Missouri
4	Deitrich Cole	Forward/center	6–9	210	Sophomore	Detroit, Michigan
5	Des Curry	Guard	6–0	180	Junior	Jacksonville, Alabama
10	Nathan Laing	Guard	6–0	165	RS sophomore	Lillington, North Carolina
13	Jared Hamilton	Guard/forward	6–4	190	Freshman	Charlotte, North Carolina
14	Edward Jones	Forward	6–7	180	RS freshman	Atlanta
15	Erik Durham	Guard	6–4	190	Junior	Springfield, Missouri
21	Malcolm Drumwright	Guard	6–2	165	Sophomore	Rancho Cucamonga, California
24	Ousmane Ba	Forward/center	6–11	227	Junior	Kinshasa, DRC
31	Christian Cunningham	Forward	6–6	200	Freshman	Albuquerque, New Mexico
32	Jeremy Watson	Forward	6–7	200	RS senior	Birmingham, Alabama
33	Andre Statam	Guard/forward	6–6	227	Freshman	Cape Girardeau, Missouri

== Schedule ==
Date time, TV	Opponent	Result	Record	Site (attendance) city, state
Regular season
11/13/2015*; 1:30 pm, ESPN3	at Central Michigan	L 83–89	0–1	McGuirk Arena (3,116); Mount Pleasant, Michigan
11/15/2015*; 2:00 pm	Fort Valley State	W 81–68	1–1	Pete Mathews Coliseum (1,004); Jacksonville, Alabama
11/16/2015*; 7:00 pm	Oakwood	W 96–60	2–1	Pete Mathews Coliseum (913); Jacksonville, Alabama
11/18/2015*; 6:00 pm, ESPN3	at Virginia Tech; Emerald Coast Classic	L 62–71	2–2	Cassell Coliseum (4,984); Blacksburg, Virginia
11/20/2015*; 6:00 pm	at Winthrop	L 69–80	2–3	Winthrop Coliseum (1,379); Rock Hill, South Carolina
11/22/2015*; 4:00 pm, ASN	at UAB; Emerald Coast Classic	L 55–61	2–4	Bartow Arena (3,939); Birmingham, Alabama
11/24/2015*; 8:00 pm	Alabama A&M	L 69–73	2–5	Pete Mathews Coliseum (1,019); Jacksonville, Alabama
11/27/2015*; 1:30 pm	vs. Chicago State; Emerald Coast Classic	W 68–65	3–5	Northwest Florida State College (250); Niceville, Florida
11/28/2015*; 1:00 pm	vs. Chattanooga; Emerald Coast Classic	L 52–62	3–6	Northwest Florida State College (250); Niceville, Florida
12/01/2015*; 8:00 pm	Samford	L 71–77	3–7	Pete Mathews Coliseum (1,491); Jacksonville, Alabama
12/05/2015*; 7:00 pm	Jacksonville	L 82–86	3–8	Pete Mathews Coliseum (1,012); Jacksonville, Alabama
12/13/2015*; 3:00 pm	Alabama State	L 60–63	3–9	Pete Mathews Coliseum (1,103); Jacksonville, Alabama
12/18/2015*; 8:00 pm	at Loyola Marymount	L 60–77	3–10	Gersten Pavilion (1,524); Los Angeles
12/21/2015*; 7:00 pm	Northern Colorado	W 79–76	4–10	Pete Mathews Coliseum (821); Jacksonville, Alabama
12/29/2015*; 4:00 pm, SECN+	at Alabama	L 59–67	4–11	Coleman Coliseum (11,417); Tuscaloosa, Alabama
Ohio Valley Conference regular season
12/31/2015; 3:30 pm	SIU Edwardsville	W 72–67	5–11 (1–0)	Pete Mathews Coliseum (724); Jacksonville, Alabama
01/02/2016; 4:30 pm	Eastern Illinois	L 64–75	5–12 (1–1)	Pete Mathews Coliseum (692); Jacksonville, Alabama
01/07/2016; 4:30 pm	at Austin Peay	L 54–73	5–13 (1–2)	Dunn Center (1,297); Clarksville, Tennessee
01/09/2016; 5:30 pm	at Murray State	L 54–69	5–14 (1–3)	CFSB Center (3,191); Murray, Kentucky
01/13/2016; 7:45 pm	at Southeast Missouri State	W 74–60	6–14 (2–3)	Show Me Center (1,275); Cape Girardeau, Missouri
01/16/2016; 12:00 pm	UT Martin	W 82–60	7–14 (3–3)	Pete Mathews Coliseum (1,009); Jacksonville, Alabama
01/21/2016; 6:00 pm	at Eastern Kentucky	L 88–91	7–15 (3–4)	McBrayer Arena (2,700); Richmond, Kentucky
01/23/2016; 12:00 pm, ASN	at Morehead State	W 78–74	8–15 (4–4)	Ellis Johnson Arena (3,870); Morehead, Kentucky
01/28/2016; 7:00 pm	Belmont	L 63–72	8–16 (4–5)	Pete Mathews Coliseum (2,488); Jacksonville, Alabama
01/30/2016; 4:30 pm	Tennessee State	L 53–78	8–17 (4–6)	Pete Mathews Coliseum (1,065); Jacksonville, Alabama
02/06/2016; 4:30 pm	Tennessee Tech	L 58–68	8–18 (4–7)	Pete Mathews Coliseum (1,248); Jacksonville, Alabama
02/10/2016; 7:30 pm	at Belmont	L 73–81	8–19 (4–8)	Curb Event Center (1,828); Nashville, Tennessee
02/13/2016; 7:30 pm	at Tennessee Tech	L 70–72	8–20 (4–9)	Eblen Center (3,611); Cookeville, Tennessee
02/20/2016; 7:30 pm	at Tennessee State	L 46–61	8–21 (4–10)	Gentry Complex (2,341); Nashville, Tennessee
02/25/2016; 7:00 pm	Eastern Kentucky	L 54–76	8–22 (4–11)	Pete Mathews Coliseum (821); Jacksonville, Alabama
02/27/2016; 4:30 pm	Morehead State	L 71–82	8–23 (4–12)	Pete Mathews Coliseum (975); Jacksonville, Alabama
*Non-conference game. ^{#}Rankings from AP Poll. (#) Tournament seedings in parentheses. All times are in Central Time.
