= 2015–16 Morehead State Eagles men's basketball team =

American college basketball season

2015–16 Morehead State Eagles men's basketball

CBI, Runner-up
- Conference: Ohio Valley Conference
- East Division
- Record: 23–14 (11–5 OVC)
- Head coach: Sean Woods (4th season)
- Assistant coaches: Dylan Howard; Preston Spradlin; Derrick Tilmon
- Home arena: Ellis Johnson Arena

2015–16 Ohio Valley Conference men's basketball standings
	Conf.				Overall
Team	W		L	PCT	W		L	PCT
East
Belmont	12	–	4	.750	20	–	12	.625
Tennessee State	11	–	5	.688	20	–	11	.645
Tennessee Tech	11	–	5	.688	19	–	12	.613
Morehead State	11	–	5	.688	23	–	14	.622
Eastern Kentucky	6	–	10	.375	15	–	16	.484
Jacksonville State	4	–	12	.250	8	–	23	.258
West
UT Martin	10	–	6	.625	20	–	15	.571
Murray State	10	–	6	.625	17	–	14	.548
Eastern Illinois	9	–	7	.563	13	–	17	.433
Austin Peay †	7	–	9	.438	18	–	18	.500
SIU Edwardsville	3	–	13	.188	6	–	22	.214
Southeast Missouri St.	2	–	14	.125	5	–	24	.172
† 2016 OVC tournament winner

The 2015–16 Morehead State Eagles men's basketball team represented Morehead State University during the 2015–16 NCAA Division I men's basketball season. The Eagles, led by fourth year head coach Sean Woods, played their home games at Ellis Johnson Arena and were members of the East Division of the Ohio Valley Conference. They finished the season 23–14, 11–5 in OVC play to finish in a three-way tie for second place in the East Division. They defeated Morehead State in the quarterfinals of the OVC tournament to advance to the semifinals where they lost to UT Martin. They were invited to the College Basketball Invitational where they defeated Siena, Duquesne, and Ohio to advance to the best-of-three finals series against Nevada where they lost 2 games to 1.

== Roster ==
Number	Name	Position	Height	Weight	Year	Hometown
1	Malik Maitland	Guard	5–11	170	Freshman	Daytona Beach, Florida
3	Corban Collins	Guard	6–3	190	RS–Junior	High Point, North Carolina
4	Ty'Quan Bitting	Forward/Center	6–9	220	Junior	Winston-Salem, North Carolina
5	Miquel Dicent	Guard	6–3	155	Sophomore	Santo Domingo, Dominican Republic
10	Anthony Elechi	Forward/Center	6–8	235	Senior	Elmont, New York
11	Keion Alexander	Forward/Center	6–9	210	Junior	Brooklyn, New York
13	Lamontray Harris	Forward	6–7	210	Freshman	Louisville, Kentucky
14	Jared Ravenscraft	Guard	6–2	210	RS–Senior	Morehead, Kentucky
15	DeJuan Marrero	Forward	6–6	190	RS–Junior	Gary, Indiana
21	Wes Noble	Forward	6–5	190	RS–Freshman	Jackson, Kentucky
22	Xavier Moon	Guard	6–2	165	Junior	Goodwater, Alabama
23	Treshaad Williams	Forward	6–5	235	Junior	Nashville, Georgia
25	Ronnye Beamon	Forward	6–5	195	Junior	Calumet City, Illinois
31	Lyonell Gaines	Forward	6–6	220	RS–Senior	Louisville, Kentucky
32	Brent Arrington	Guard	6–3	190	RS–Senior	Halethorpe, Maryland

== Schedule ==
Date time, TV	Opponent	Result	Record	Site (attendance) city, state
Exhibition
11/03/2015*; 7:00 pm	Asbury	W 107–57		Ellis Johnson Arena; Morehead, Kentucky
Regular season
11/13/2015*; 7:45 pm	Cincinnati Christian	W 87–51	1–0	Ellis Johnson Arena (2,367); Morehead, Kentucky
11/16/2015*; 8:00 pm	at Illinois State	L 66–67	1–1	Redbird Arena (4,698); Normal, Illinois
11/21/2015*; 7:00 pm	at Northern Kentucky	W 64–56	2–1	BB&T Arena (2,798); Highland Heights, Kentucky
11/24/2015*; 7:00 pm	Marshall	W 85–61	3–1	Ellis Johnson Arena (3,432); Morehead, Kentucky
11/28/2015*; 4:00 pm	Southern Miss	W 61–46	4–1	Ellis Johnson Arena (2,775); Morehead, Kentucky
12/02/2015*; 8:00 pm, FSMW	at Saint Louis	W 60–46	5–1	Chaifetz Arena (5,071); St. Louis, Missouri
12/05/2015*; 7:00 pm, BTN	at Indiana	L 59–92	5–2	Assembly Hall (17,472); Bloomington, Indiana
12/13/2015*; 4:00 pm, ESPN3	at Pittsburgh; Gotham Classic	L 62–72	5–3	Petersen Events Center (7,065); Pittsburgh
12/17/2015*; 9:00 pm	at Eastern Washington; Gotham Classic			Reese Court; Cheney, Washington
12/20/2015*; 4:00 pm	Western Carolina; Gotham Classic	W 60–52	6–3	Ellis Johnson Arena (2,153); Morehead, Kentucky
12/23/2015*; 1:00 pm	at Davidson; Gotham Classic	L 77–81	6–4	John M. Belk Arena (4,561); Davidson, North Carolina
12/28/2015*; 7:00 pm	Green Bay	L 72–78	6–5	Ellis Johnson Arena (2,634); Morehead, Kentucky
12/30/2015*; 7:00 pm	at East Tennessee State	L 72–75	6–6	Freedom Hall Civic Center (2,650); Johnson City, Tennessee
01/02/2016; 3:00 pm, CBSSN	at Murray State	L 57–62	6–7 (0–1)	CFSB Center (3,125); Murray, Kentucky
01/07/2016; 6:00 pm	Southeast Missouri State	W 96–69	7–7 (1–1)	Ellis Johnson Arena (2,010); Morehead, Kentucky
01/09/2016; 6:00 pm	UT Martin	W 64–58	8–7 (2–1)	Ellis Johnson Arena (3,045); Morehead, Kentucky
01/14/2016; 8:00 pm	at SIU Edwardsville	W 70–67 ^{OT}	8–7 (3–2)	Vadalabene Center (1,547); Edwardsville, Illinois
01/16/2016; 4:15 pm	at Eastern Illinois	L 82–84 ^{OT}	9–8 (3–2)	Lantz Arena (1,369); Charleston, Illinois
01/21/2016; 7:00 pm	Tennessee Tech	W 81–74	10–8 (4–2)	Ellis Johnson Arena (2,735); Morehead, Kentucky
01/23/2016; 1:00 pm, ASN	Jacksonville State	L 74–78	10–9 (4–3)	Ellis Johnson Arena (3,870); Morehead, Kentucky
01/27/2016; 7:45 pm	Austin Peay	W 75–65	11–9 (5–3)	Ellis Johnson Arena (2,765); Morehead, Kentucky
01/30/2016; 7:00 pm	at Eastern Kentucky	W 70–67	12–9 (6–3)	McBrayer Arena (3,900); Richmond, Kentucky
02/04/2016; 8:00 pm	at Belmont	L 67–73	12–10 (6–4)	Curb Event Center (1,559); Nashville, Tennessee
02/06/2016; 8:30 pm	at Tennessee State	L 76–77	12–11 (6–5)	Gentry Complex (6,312); Nashville, Tennessee
02/11/2016; 7:00 pm, CBSSN	Eastern Kentucky	W 61–50	13–11 (7–5)	Ellis Johnson Arena (4,214); Morehead, Kentucky
02/13/2016; 12:00 pm, CBSSN	Belmont	W 78–77	14–11 (8–5)	Ellis Johnson Arena (3,845); Morehead, Kentucky
02/16/2016*; 7:00 pm	St. Catharine	W 105–66	15–11	Ellis Johnson Arena (2,511); Morehead, Kentucky
02/18/2016; 7:00 pm	Tennessee State	W 66–61	16–11 (9–5)	Ellis Johnson Arena (2,800); Morehead, Kentucky
02/25/2016; 7:00 pm	at Tennessee Tech	W 69–59	17–11 (10–5)	Eblen Center (2,567); Cookeville, Tennessee
02/27/2016; 5:30 pm	at Jacksonville State	W 82–71	18–11 (11–5)	Pete Mathews Coliseum (975); Jacksonville, Alabama
Ohio Valley tournament
03/03/2016; 9:00 pm	vs. Murray State; Quarterfinals	W 75–62	19–11	Nashville Municipal Auditorium (1,545); Nashville, Tennessee
03/04/2016; 9:30 pm, ESPNU	vs. UT Martin; Semifinals	L 70–83	19–12	Nashville Municipal Auditorium (2,167); Nashville, Tennessee
CBI
03/15/2016*; 7:00 pm	at Siena; First round	W 84–80	20–12	Times Union Center (2,061); Albany, New York
03/21/2016*; 7:00 pm	Duquesne; Quarterfinals	W 82–72	21–12	Ellis Johnson Arena (1,387); Morehead, Kentucky
03/23/2016*; 7:00 pm	at Ohio; Semifinals	W 77–72	22–12	Convocation Center (3,712); Athens, Ohio
03/28/2016*; 8:30 pm, ESPNU	Nevada; Finals – Game 1	W 86–83	23–12	Ellis Johnson Arena (4,187); Morehead, Kentucky
03/30/2016*; 9:00 pm, ESPNU	at Nevada; Finals – Game 2	L 68–77	23–13	Lawlor Events Center (7,431); Reno, Nevada
04/01/2016*; 9:00 pm, ESPNU	at Nevada; Finals – Game 3	L 82–85 ^{OT}	23–14	Lawlor Events Center (9,043); Reno, Nevada
*Non-conference game. (#) Tournament seedings in parentheses. All times are in Eastern Time.
