= 2015–16 Tennessee State Tigers basketball team =

American college basketball season

2015–16 Tennessee State Tigers basketball

CIT, First round
- Conference: Ohio Valley Conference
- East Division
- Record: 20–11 (11–5 OVC)
- Head coach: Dana Ford (2nd season)
- Assistant coaches: Randy Peele; Rodney Hamilton; Pierre Jordan
- Home arena: Gentry Complex

2015–16 Ohio Valley Conference men's basketball standings
	Conf.				Overall
Team	W		L	PCT	W		L	PCT
East
Belmont	12	–	4	.750	20	–	12	.625
Tennessee State	11	–	5	.688	20	–	11	.645
Tennessee Tech	11	–	5	.688	19	–	12	.613
Morehead State	11	–	5	.688	23	–	14	.622
Eastern Kentucky	6	–	10	.375	15	–	16	.484
Jacksonville State	4	–	12	.250	8	–	23	.258
West
UT Martin	10	–	6	.625	20	–	15	.571
Murray State	10	–	6	.625	17	–	14	.548
Eastern Illinois	9	–	7	.563	13	–	17	.433
Austin Peay †	7	–	9	.438	18	–	18	.500
SIU Edwardsville	3	–	13	.188	6	–	22	.214
Southeast Missouri St.	2	–	14	.125	5	–	24	.172
† 2016 OVC tournament winner

The 2015–16 Tennessee State Tigers basketball team represented Tennessee State University during the 2015–16 NCAA Division I men's basketball season. The Tigers, led by second year head coach Dana Ford, played their home games at the Gentry Complex and were members of the East Division of the Ohio Valley Conference. They finished the season 20–11, 11–5 in OVC play to finish in a three-way tie for second place in the East Division. They lost in the quarterfinals of the OVC tournament to Austin Peay. They were invited to the CollegeInsider.com Tournament where they lost in the first round to Ball State.

== Roster ==
Number	Name	Position	Height	Weight	Year	Hometown
0	Armani Chaney	Guard	5–10	162	Freshman	Chicago, Illinois
1	Jordan Reed	Guard	6–4	210	Senior	Philadelphia
2	Marcus Roper	Guard	6–5	200	Senior	Fort Walton Beach, Florida
3	Xavier Richards	Guard	6–2	200	Senior	Saint Thomas, U.S. Virgin Islands
5	Tahjere McCall	Guard	6–5	195	Junior	Philadelphia
10	Thomas Davis	Guard	6–2	165	Freshman	Nashville, Tennessee
11	Demontez Loman	Forward	6–6	192	Senior	South Port, North Carolina
13	Samson Oyediran	Forward	6–7	220	RS–Freshman	London, England
14	Darreon Raddick	Guard	6–4	204	Sophomore	Belleville, Illinois
15	Keron Deshields	Guard	6–2	195	Senior	Baltimore, Maryland
20	Johnny Woodard	Guard	6–4	222	Junior	Duluth, Minnesota
21	Christian Mekowulu	Forward	6–9	232	Sophomore	Lagos, Nigeria
23	Neville Fincher	Center	6–10	246	Junior	Teaneck, New Jersey
30	Khalil Spencer	Guard	6–4	220	Freshman	Memphis, Tennessee
33	Wayne Martin	Forward	6–7	237	Junior	Brooklyn, New York
34	Jalen Duke	Forward	6–5	213	Freshman	Nashville, Tennessee
42	Christian Griggs-Williams	Forward	6–7	265	Senior	Milwaukee, Wisconsin

== Schedule ==
Date time, TV	Opponent	Result	Record	Site (attendance) city, state
Exhibition
11/07/2015*; 7:00 pm	Cal State East Bay	W 66–61		Kean Hall; Nashville, Tennessee
Regular season
11/13/2015*; 6:30 pm	at Loyola (MD)	W 86–71	1–0	Reitz Arena (2,100); Baltimore
11/16/2015*; 6:00 pm	at Ohio	L 67–75	1–1	Convocation Center (5,854); Athens, Ohio
11/18/2015*; 7:00 pm	Fisk	W 72–50	2–1	Gentry Complex (5,889); Nashville, Tennessee
11/21/2015*; 7:00 pm	Middle Tennessee	L 66–69	2–2	Gentry Complex (1,500); Nashville, Tennessee
11/24/2015*; 7:00 pm	Reinhardt	W 77–61	3–2	Gentry Complex (605); Nashville, Tennessee
11/28/2015*; 6:00 pm, ESPN3	at Kennesaw State	W 56–49	4–2	KSU Convocation Center (884); Kennesaw, Georgia
12/05/2015*; 1:00 pm	Stetson	W 74–54	5–2	Gentry Complex (754); Nashville, Tennessee
12/12/2015*; 1:00 pm	vs. Grambling State; HBCU Heritage Hardweood Classic	W 64–52	6–2	Kroc Center (1,482); Chicago
12/14/2015*; 6:00 pm, ESPN3	at Stetson	W 93–90 ^{2OT}	7–2	Edmunds Center (695); DeLand, Florida
12/17/2015*; 7:00 pm	Lipscomb	W 89–86	8–2	Gentry Complex (540); Nashville, Tennessee
12/19/2015*; 4:00 pm	vs. Alcorn State; HBCU Heritage Hardwood Classic	W 81–76	9–2	Verties Sails Gymnasium (176); Nashville, Tennessee
12/22/2015*; 6:00 pm, ESPN3	at Illinois State	L 55–66	9–3	Redbird Arena (4,205); Normal, Illinois
12/29/2015*; 6:00 pm, ESPNU	at Tennessee	L 69–74	9–4	Thompson–Boling Arena (13,214); Knoxville, Tennessee
Ohio Valley Conference regular season
01/02/2016; 4:15 pm	at Southeast Missouri State	W 72–66	10–4 (1–0)	Show Me Center (1,168); Cape Girardeau, Missouri
01/06/2016; 7:00 pm	at Eastern Illinois	W 66–61	11–4 (2–0)	Lantz Arena (716); Charleston, Illinois
01/09/2016; 7:30 pm	SIU Edwardsville	W 63–60	12–4 (3–0)	Gentry Complex (1,368); Nashville, Tennessee
01/14/2016; 7:30 pm	Austin Peay	W 66–52	13–4 (4–0)	Gentry Complex (1,488); Nashville, Tennessee
01/16/2016; 7:30 pm	Murray State	W 73–71	14–4 (5–0)	Gentry Complex (2,246); Nashville, Tennessee
01/23/2016; 5:00 pm	at Belmont	L 95–103	14–5 (5–1)	Curb Event Center (2,213); Nashville, Tennessee
01/28/2016; 8:00 pm, ASN	at Tennessee Tech	L 79–81	14–6 (5–2)	Eblen Center (2,146); Cookeville, Tennessee
01/30/2016; 4:30 pm	at Jacksonville State	W 78–53	15–6 (6–2)	Pete Mathews Coliseum (1,065); Jacksonville, Alabama
02/04/2016; 7:00 pm	Eastern Kentucky	L 81–97	15–7 (6–3)	Gentry Complex (1,552); Nashville, Tennessee
02/06/2016; 7:30 pm	Morehead State	W 77–76	16–7 (7–3)	Gentry Complex (6,312); Nashville, Tennessee
02/10/2016; 7:30 pm	Tennessee Tech	W 85–55	17–7 (8–3)	Gentry Complex (2,554); Nashville, Tennessee
02/13/2016; 1:00 pm	at Eastern Kentucky	W 79–78	18–7 (9–3)	McBrayer Arena (2,700); Richmond, Kentucky
02/18/2016; 6:00 pm	at Morehead State	L 61–66	18–8 (9–4)	Ellis Johnson Arena (2,800); Morehead, Kentucky
02/20/2016; 7:30 pm	Jacksonville State	W 61–46	19–8 (10–4)	Gentry Complex (2,341); Nashville, Tennessee
02/25/2016; 6:00 pm	at UT Martin	L 56–72	19–9 (10–5)	Skyhawk Arena (2,072); Martin, Tennessee
02/28/2016; 2:30 pm	Belmont	W 87–72	20–9 (11–5)	Gentry Complex (6,845); Nashville, Tennessee
Ohio Valley Conference tournament
03/03/2016; 6:00 pm	vs. Austin Peay; Quarterfinals	L 72–74	20–10	Nashville Municipal Auditorium (1,545); Nashville, Tennessee
CIT
03/15/2016*; 7:00 pm	Ball State; First round	L 73–78 ^{2OT}	20–11	Gentry Complex (1,013); Nashville, Tennessee
*Non-conference game. ^{#}Rankings from AP Poll. (#) Tournament seedings in parentheses. All times are in Central Time.
