= 2015–16 Georgia Bulldogs basketball team =

American college basketball season

2015–16 Georgia Bulldogs basketball

NIT, Second Round
- Conference: Southeastern Conference
- Record: 20–14 (10–8 SEC)
- Head coach: Mark Fox (7th season)
- Assistant coach: Philip Pearson; Jonas Hayes; Yasir Rosemond
- Home arena: Stegeman Coliseum

2015–16 Southeastern Conference men's basketball standings
	Conf.				Overall
Team	W		L	PCT	W		L	PCT
No. 15 Texas A&M	13	–	5	.722	28	–	9	.757
No. 10 Kentucky †	13	–	5	.722	27	–	9	.750
South Carolina	11	–	7	.611	25	–	9	.735
Vanderbilt	11	–	7	.611	19	–	14	.576
LSU	11	–	7	.611	19	–	14	.576
Ole Miss	10	–	8	.556	20	–	12	.625
Georgia	10	–	8	.556	20	–	14	.588
Florida	9	–	9	.500	21	–	15	.583
Arkansas	9	–	9	.500	16	–	16	.500
Alabama	8	–	10	.444	18	–	15	.545
Mississippi State	7	–	11	.389	14	–	17	.452
Tennessee	6	–	12	.333	15	–	19	.441
Auburn	5	–	13	.278	11	–	20	.355
Missouri^{*}	3	–	15	.167	10	–	21	.323
† 2016 SEC tournament winner^{*}Ineligible for postseason play due to self-imposed postseason ban. Rankings from AP poll

The 2015–16 Georgia bulldogs basketball team represented the University of Georgia during the 2015–16 NCAA Division I men's basketball season. The team's head coach was Mark Fox, who was in his seventh season at UGA. They played their home games at Stegeman Coliseum and were members of the Southeastern Conference. They finished the season 20–14, 10–8 in SEC play to finish in a tie for sixth place. They defeated Mississippi State and South Carolina to advance to the semifinals of the SEC tournament where they lost to Kentucky. They were invited to the National Invitation Tournament where they defeated Belmont in the first round to advance to the second round where they lost to Saint Mary's.

== Previous season ==
The 2014–15 Bulldogs advanced to the semifinals of the SEC Tournament whey they lost to Arkansas. They received an at-large bid to the NCAA Tournament where they lost to Michigan State in the Second Round.

== Departures ==
Name	Number	Pos.	Height	Weight	Year	Hometown	Notes
Marcus Thornton	2	F	6'8"	235	RS Senior	Atlanta, GA	Graduated
Taylor Echols	10	G	6'1"	175	Senior	McDonough, GA	Graduated
Cameron Forte	11	F	6'7"	220	Junior	Tempe, AZ	Graduated & transferred to Portland State
Dusan Langura	20	G	6'4"	205	Sophomore	Romont, Switzerland	Transferred to Mississippi Valley State
Nemanja Djurisic	42	F	6'8"	230	Senior	Podgorica, Montenegro	Graduated

== Recruits class of 2015 ==
College recruiting information
Name	Hometown	School	Height	Weight	Commit date
Derek Ogbeide; C	Mableton, GA	Pebblebrook High School	6 ft 9 in (2.06 m)	235 lb (107 kg)	Nov 19, 2014
Derek Ogbeide; C	Recruit ratings: Scout: Rivals: 247Sports: ESPN:				
Will Jackson; PG	Athens, GA	Athens Christian School	6 ft 4 in (1.93 m)	190 lb (86 kg)	Jul 7, 2014
Will Jackson; PG	Recruit ratings: Scout: Rivals: 247Sports: ESPN:				
E'Torrion Wilridge; SF	Beaumont, TX	Central High School	6 ft 7 in (2.01 m)	200 lb (91 kg)	Oct 11, 2014
E'Torrion Wilridge; SF	Recruit ratings: Scout: Rivals: 247Sports: ESPN:				
Michael Edwards; C	Westland, MI	John Glenn High School	6 ft 9 in (2.06 m)	225 lb (102 kg)	Apr 13, 2015
Michael Edwards; C	Recruit ratings: Scout: Rivals: 247Sports: ESPN:				
Overall recruit ranking: Scout: Not Ranked Rivals: Not Ranked ESPN: Not Ranked
Note: In many cases, Scout, Rivals, 247Sports, On3, and ESPN may conflict in their listings of height and weight.; In these cases, the average was taken. ESPN grades are on a 100-point scale.; Sources: "Georgia 2015 Basketball Commitments". Rivals.; "2015 Georgia Basketball Commits". Scout.; "ESPN". ESPN.; "Scout.com Team Recruiting Rankings". Scout.; "2015 Team Ranking". Rivals.

=== Recruits class of 2016 ===
College recruiting information (2016)
Name	Hometown	School	Height	Weight	Commit date
Jordan Harris; SG	Donalsonville, GA	Seminole County Middle-High School	6 ft 5 in (1.96 m)	175 lb (79 kg)	Sep 9, 2014
Jordan Harris; SG	Recruit ratings: Scout: Rivals: 247Sports: ESPN:				
Tyree Crump; SG	Bainbridge, GA	Bainbridge High School	6 ft 2 in (1.88 m)	170 lb (77 kg)	Sep 9, 2014
Tyree Crump; SG	Recruit ratings: Scout: Rivals: 247Sports: ESPN:				
Overall recruit ranking: Scout: Not Ranked Rivals: Not Ranked ESPN: Not Ranked
Note: In many cases, Scout, Rivals, 247Sports, On3, and ESPN may conflict in their listings of height and weight.; In these cases, the average was taken. ESPN grades are on a 100-point scale.; Sources: "Georgia 2016 Basketball Commitments". Rivals.; "2016 Georgia Basketball Commits". Scout.; "ESPN". ESPN.; "Scout.com Team Recruiting Rankings". Scout.; "2016 Team Ranking". Rivals.

== Roster ==
2015–16 Georgia Bulldogs men's basketball team
Players
Coaches

Pos.	#	Name	Height	Weight	Year	Previous school	Hometown
G	0	William Jackson II	6 ft 2 in (1.88 m)	185 lb (84 kg)	Fr	Athens Christian School	Athens, GA
F/C	1	Yante Maten	6 ft 8 in (2.03 m)	240 lb (109 kg)	So	Bloomfield Hills HS	Bloomfield Hills, MI
G	3	Juwan Parker	6 ft 4 in (1.93 m)	205 lb (93 kg)	Jr	Washington HS	Tulsa, OK
G	4	Charles Mann	6 ft 5 in (1.96 m)	215 lb (98 kg)	Sr	Milton HS	Alpharetta, GA
G	12	Kenny Gaines	6 ft 3 in (1.91 m)	200 lb (91 kg)	Sr	Whitefield Academy	Atlanta, GA
F	13	E'Torrion Wilridge	6 ft 6 in (1.98 m)	215 lb (98 kg)	Fr	Central Medical Magnet HS	Beaumont, TX
G	14	Brandon Young	5 ft 10 in (1.78 m)	160 lb (73 kg)	Jr	Marist HS	Atlanta, GA
C	15	Osahen Iduwe	6 ft 10 in (2.08 m)	235 lb (107 kg)	So	St. Johns NW Military	Benin City, Nigeria
F	24	Houston Kessler	6 ft 8 in (2.03 m)	225 lb (102 kg)	RS Jr	Landmark Christian	Newnan, GA
F	25	Kenny Paul Geno	6 ft 6 in (1.98 m)	210 lb (95 kg)	Jr	Booneville HS	Booneville, MS
G	30	J. J. Frazier	5 ft 10 in (1.78 m)	155 lb (70 kg)	Jr	Faith Baptist Christian	Glennville, GA
F	32	Mike Edwards	6 ft 9 in (2.06 m)	225 lb (102 kg)	Fr	John Glenn HS	Westland, MI
F	33	Connor O'Neill	6 ft 6 in (1.98 m)	220 lb (100 kg)	Fr	Tilton School	Roswell, GA
F	34	Derek Ogbeide	6 ft 8 in (2.03 m)	240 lb (109 kg)	Fr	Pebblebrook HS	Atlanta, GA

Head coach

- Mark Fox (Eastern New Mexico)

Assistant coach(es)

- Philip Pearson (Alabama)
- Jonas Hayes (Georgia)
- Yasir Rosemond (Oregon)

Legend

- (C) Team captain
- (S) Suspended
- (I) Ineligible
- (W) Walk-on
- Injured
- Current redshirt

Roster

== Schedule and results ==
Date time, TV	Rank^{#}	Opponent^{#}	Result	Record	Site (attendance) city, state
Exhibition
November 6*; 7:00 pm		Armstrong State	W 59–41		Stegeman Coliseum; Athens, GA
Regular season
November 13*; 7:00 pm		Chattanooga	L 90–92 ^{OT}	0–1	Stegeman Coliseum (5,925); Athens, GA
November 20*; 7:00 pm		Murray State	W 63–52	1–1	Stegeman Coliseum (5,982); Athens, GA
November 25*; 5:00 pm, ESPNU		High Point	W 49–46	2–1	Stegeman Coliseum (5,348); Athens, GA
November 28*; 7:00 pm, FS1		at Seton Hall	L 62–69	2–2	Prudential Center (6,553); Newark, NJ
December 1*; 7:00 pm		Oakland	W 86–82	3–2	Stegeman Coliseum (5,166); Athens, GA
December 4*; 7:00 pm, SECN		Kansas State	L 66–68	3–3	Stegeman Coliseum (6,949); Athens, GA
December 8*; 7:00 pm, SECN		Winthrop	W 74–64	4–3	Stegeman Coliseum (4,621); Athens, GA
December 19*; 12:00 pm, SECN		Georgia Tech	W 75–61	5–3	Stegeman Coliseum (8,011); Athens, GA
December 22*; 6:00 pm, SECN		Clemson	W 71–48	6–3	Stegeman Coliseum (10,523); Athens, GA
December 29*; 7:00 pm, SECN		Robert Morris	W 79–67	7–3	Stegeman Coliseum (6,458); Athens, GA
January 2; 8:00 pm, ESPNU		at Florida	L 63–77	7–4 (0–1)	O'Connell Center (9,053); Gainesville, FL
January 6; 7:00 pm, SECN		Missouri	W 77–59	8–4 (1–1)	Stegeman Coliseum; Athens, GA
January 9; 8:30 pm, SECN		at Ole Miss	L 71–72	8–5 (1–2)	The Pavilion at Ole Miss (9,487); Oxford, MS
January 13; 7:00 pm, SECN		Tennessee	W 81–72	9–5 (2–2)	Stegeman Coliseum (8,029); Athens, GA
January 16; 7:00 pm, ESPNU		No. 15 Texas A&M	L 45–79	9–6 (2–3)	Stegeman Coliseum (10,523); Athens, GA
January 20; 7:00 pm, SECN		at Missouri	W 60–57	10–6 (3–3)	Mizzou Arena (5,453); Columbia, MO
January 23; 6:00 pm, SECN		Arkansas	W 66–63 ^{OT}	11–6 (4–3)	Stegeman Coliseum (10,523); Athens, GA
January 26; 9:00 pm, ESPN		at LSU	L 85–89	11–7 (4–4)	Maravich Center (10,749); Baton Rouge, LA
January 30*; 6:00 pm, ESPN2		at No. 17 Baylor; Big 12/SEC Challenge	L 73–83	11–8	Ferrell Center (9,675); Waco, TX
February 2; 7:00 pm, ESPNU		No. 25 South Carolina	W 69–56	12–8 (5–4)	Stegeman Coliseum (6,427); Athens, GA
February 6; 5:30 pm, SECN		Auburn	W 65–55	13–8 (6–4)	Stegeman Coliseum (10,523); Athens, GA
February 9; 9:00 pm, ESPN		at No. 22 Kentucky	L 48–82	13–9 (6–5)	Rupp Arena (22,136); Lexington, KY
February 13; 8:00 pm, SECN		at Mississippi State	W 66–57	14–9 (7–5)	Humphrey Coliseum (6,811); Starkville, MS
February 16; 9:00 pm, ESPN		Florida	L 53–57	14–10 (7–6)	Stegeman Coliseum (8,021); Athens, GA
February 19; 12:00 pm, ESPN2		at Vanderbilt	L 67–80	14–11 (7–7)	Memorial Gymnasium (11,745); Nashville, TN
February 24; 7:00 pm, SECN		at Auburn	L 81–84	14–12 (7–8)	Auburn Arena (7,112); Auburn, AL
February 27; 12:00 pm, SECN		Ole Miss	W 80–66	15–12 (8–8)	Stegeman Coliseum (9,874); Athens, GA
March 3; 7:00 pm, ESPN2		at South Carolina	W 74–72	16–12 (9–8)	Colonial Life Arena (15,397); Columbia, SC
March 5; 4:00 pm, ESPN2		Alabama	W 70–63	17–12 (10–8)	Stegeman Coliseum (8,280); Athens, GA
SEC Tournament
March 10; 9:00 pm, SECN	(6)	vs. (11) Mississippi State; Second Round	W 79–69	18–12	Bridgestone Arena (11,750); Nashville, TN
March 11; 9:30 pm, SECN	(6)	vs. (3) South Carolina; Quarterfinals	W 65–64	19–12	Bridgestone Arena (18,049); Nashville, TN
March 12; 3:30 pm, ESPN	(6)	vs. (2) No. 16 Kentucky; Semifinals	L 80–93	19–13	Bridgestone Arena (19,108); Nashville, TN
NIT
March 16*; 7:00 pm, ESPN2	(3)	(6) Belmont; First Round – Valparaiso Bracket	W 93–84	20–13	Stegeman Coliseum (2,965); Athens, GA
March 20*; 7:30 pm, ESPNU	(3)	at (2) Saint Mary's; Second Round – Valparaiso Bracket	L 65–77	20–14	McKeon Pavilion (2,050); Moraga, CA
*Non-conference game. ^{#}Rankings from AP Poll. (#) Tournament seedings in parentheses. All times are in Eastern Time.

== See also ==
2015–16 Georgia Lady Bulldogs basketball team
