= Chris Horton (basketball) =

American basketball player (born 1994)

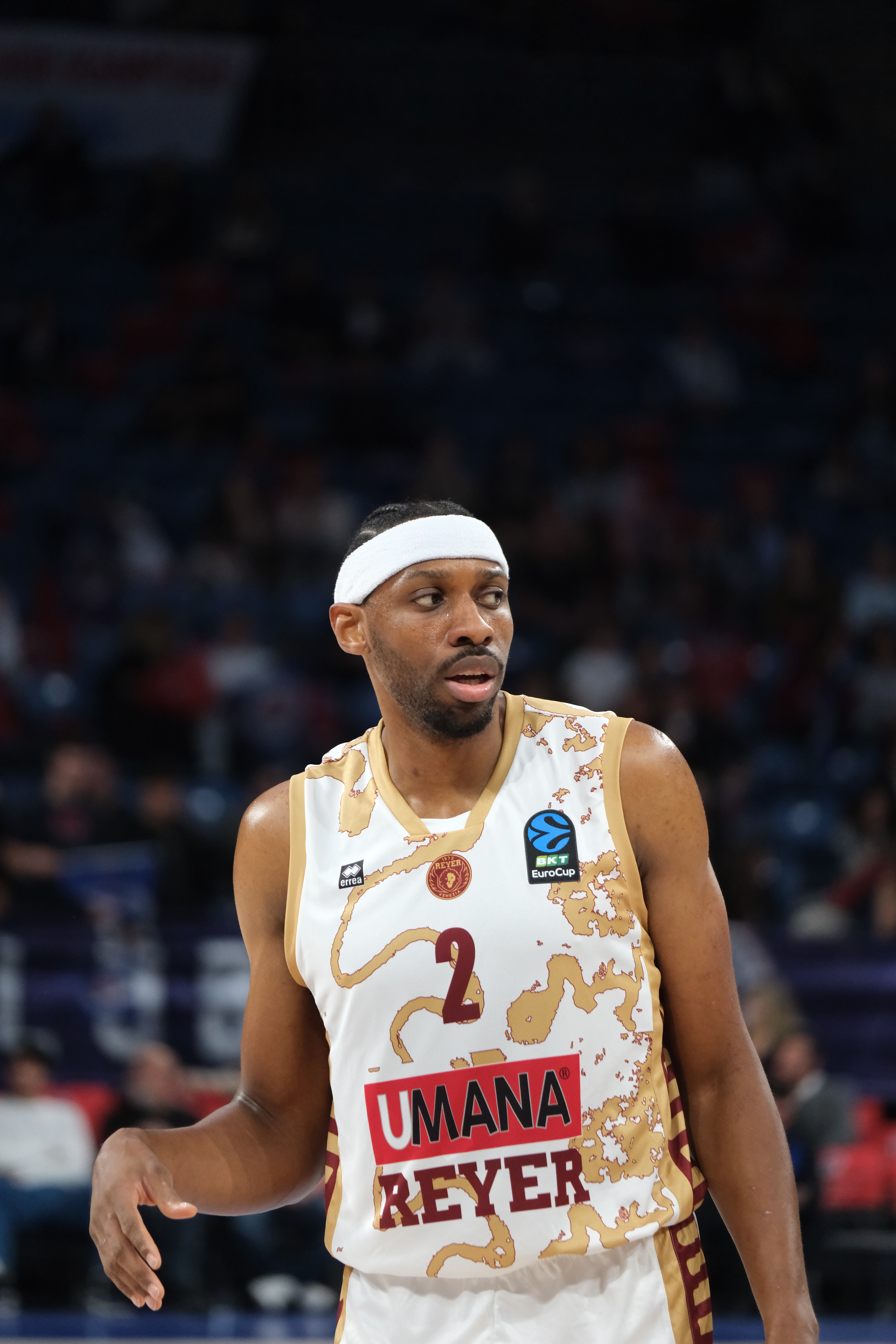
- Horton with Reyer Venezia in 2025

Petkim Spor
- Position: Power forward / center
- League: BSL

Personal information
- Born: June 29, 1994 (age 32) Decatur, Georgia, U.S.
- Listed height: 6 ft 8 in (2.03 m)
- Listed weight: 225 lb (102 kg)

Career information
- High school: Columbia (Decatur, Georgia)
- College: Austin Peay (2012–2016)
- NBA draft: 2016: undrafted
- Playing career: 2016–present

Career history
- 2016–2017: Grand Rapids Drive
- 2017–2018: Alba Fehérvár
- 2018–2019: Kymi
- 2019–2020: Cholet
- 2020: BCM Gravelines-Dunkerque
- 2021: Cholet
- 2021–2022: Nanterre
- 2022: Hapoel Tel Aviv
- 2022–2023: Lokomotiv Kuban
- 2023–2025: Trapani Shark
- 2025–2026: Reyer Venezia
- 2026–present: Petkim Spor

Career highlights
- All-LNB Élite First Team (2022); 2× LNB Élite rebounding leader (2020, 2022); LNB Élite blocks leader (2022); 2× LNB All-Star Game (2020, 2022); First team All-OVC (2016); OVC Freshman of the Year (2013); OVC tournament MVP (2016)

Chris Horton (born June 29, 1994) is an American professional basketball player for Petkim Spor of the Basketbol Süper Ligi (BSL). He played college basketball at Austin Peay.

== College career ==
Horton was a four-year starter for the Austin Peay Governors. During his freshman season, Horton set a school record for blocks in a season with 100 and finished sixth in Division I with 3.23 blocks per game to go with 8.2 points and 6.8 rebounds per game this season and was named the Ohio Valley Conference (OVC) Freshman of the Year and to the conference All-Newcomer team. As a senior, he averaged 18.8 points, 12.0 rebounds and 1.75 blocks per game and 25 double-doubles and was named first team All-OVC. Horton was named the MVP of the 2016 OVC tournament after scoring 90 points and grabbing 57 rebounds during eighth-seeded Governors' run to the conference title. Horton finished his collegiate career as the fifth-leading scorer in school history with 1,719 points, the second-leading rebounder with 1,261 and the all-time leader with 319 shots blocked (2nd most in OVC history).

== Professional career ==
=== Grand Rapids Drive ===
After going unselected in the 2016 NBA draft, Horton was named to the Miami Heat's Summer League roster. Following his performance in Summer League, Horton was selected 5th overall in the 2016 NBA Development League draft by the Grand Rapids Drive. Horton averaged 6.2 points, 5.5 rebounds and 0.9 blocks per game in 49 games (11 starts) for the Drive in his rookie season. The Drive traded his overseas rights to the Delaware Blue Coats on January 22, 2019.

=== Alba Fehérvár ===
Horton signed with Alba Fehérvár of the Hungarian Nemzeti Bajnokság I/A (NB I/A) on August 3, 2017. Horton averaged 8.8 points, 6.6 rebounds and 1.3 blocks per game in 39 NB I/A games and 9.6 points, 6.9 rebounds and 1.8 blocks in 12 FIBA Europe Cup games with Alba.

=== Kymi ===
Horton signed with Kymi of the Greek Basket League (GBL) on July 30, 2018. Horton was named the GBL Player of the Week after scoring 24 points and grabbing 15 rebounds against PAOK on November 10, 2018. Horton finished the regular season as the league leader with 9.1 rebounds and 1.7 steals per game, fifth in the league with 13.6 points per game, and third with 1.6 blocks in 23 total games (16 starts) and was named honorable mention All-GBL by EuroBasket.com.

=== Cholet ===
Horton signed with Cholet Basket of the French LNB Pro A on July 15, 2019. Horton was selected to play for the "World" team in the 2020 LNB All-Star Game. Horton averaged 17 points, nine rebounds and 1.7 assists for Cholet.

=== BCM Gravelines-Dunkerque ===
On June 13, 2020, he signed with BCM Gravelines-Dunkerque of the LNB Pro A.

=== Cholet Basket ===
On January 2, 2021, he signed with Cholet Basket of the LNB Pro A.

=== Nanterre 92 ===
On July 22, 2021, Horton signed with Nanterre 92. On May 18, 2022, Horton was named to the All-LNB Pro A First Team of the 2021–22 season.

=== Hapoel Tel Aviv ===
On July 28, 2022, he signed with Hapoel Tel Aviv of the Israeli Basketball Premier League.

=== Lokomotiv Kuban ===
On November 29, 2022, he signed with Lokomotiv Kuban of the VTB United League.

=== Trapani Shark ===
On September 27, 2023, he signed with Trapani Shark of the Serie A2. He also played for the following season in the Italian top–tier basketball league, LBA, which the team promoted for the second time in 32 years

=== Reyer Venezia ===
On June 16, 2025, he signed with Umana Reyer Venezia of the Italian Lega Basket Serie A (LBA).

=== Petkim Spor ===
On July 2, 2026, he signed with Petkim Spor of the Basketbol Süper Ligi (BSL).
