= 2015–16 Southeast Missouri State Redhawks men's basketball team =

American college basketball season

2015–16 Southeast Missouri State Redhawks men's basketball
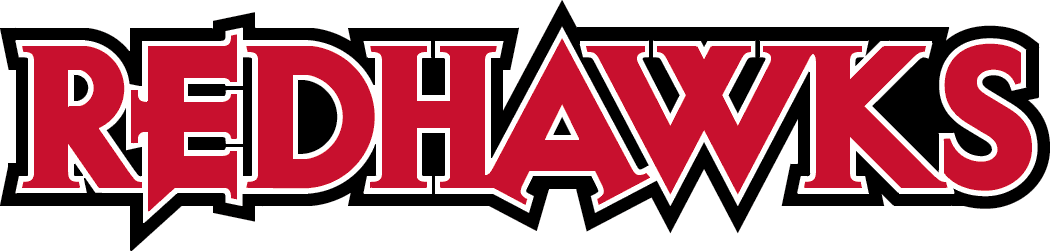
- Conference: Ohio Valley Conference
- West Division
- Record: 5–24 (2–14 OVC)
- Head coach: Rick Ray (1st season)
- Assistant coaches: Adam Gordon; Chris Moore; Nick Lagroone
- Home arena: Show Me Center

2015–16 Ohio Valley Conference men's basketball standings
	Conf.				Overall
Team	W		L	PCT	W		L	PCT
East
Belmont	12	–	4	.750	20	–	12	.625
Tennessee State	11	–	5	.688	20	–	11	.645
Tennessee Tech	11	–	5	.688	19	–	12	.613
Morehead State	11	–	5	.688	23	–	14	.622
Eastern Kentucky	6	–	10	.375	15	–	16	.484
Jacksonville State	4	–	12	.250	8	–	23	.258
West
UT Martin	10	–	6	.625	20	–	15	.571
Murray State	10	–	6	.625	17	–	14	.548
Eastern Illinois	9	–	7	.563	13	–	17	.433
Austin Peay †	7	–	9	.438	18	–	18	.500
SIU Edwardsville	3	–	13	.188	6	–	22	.214
Southeast Missouri St.	2	–	14	.125	5	–	24	.172
† 2016 OVC tournament winner

The 2015–16 Southeast Missouri State Redhawks men's basketball team represented Southeast Missouri State University during the 2015–16 NCAA Division I men's basketball season. The Redhawks, led by first year head coach Rick Ray, played their home games at the Show Me Center and were members of the West Division of the Ohio Valley Conference. They finished the season 5–24, 2–14 in OVC play to finish in last place in the West Division. They failed to qualify for the OVC tournament.

== Roster ==
Number	Name	Position	Height	Weight	Year	Hometown
0	Jaylin Stewart	Forward	6–7	210	Freshman	Tallahassee, Florida
1	Tony Anderson	Forward	6–9	230	Freshman	Columbus, Ohio
2	Isiah Jones	Guard	6–4	193	Senior	Pulaski, Illinois
3	Eric McGill	Guard	6–2	180	Freshman	Memphis, Tennessee
4	Antonius Cleveland	Guard	6–6	188	Junior	Memphis, Tennessee
5	Joel Angus III	Forward	6–7	215	Junior	Brooklyn, New York
10	Robby Dosier	Guard	6–3	170	Freshman	Carbondale, Illinois
11	Marcus Wallace	Guard	6–1	175	Sophomore	Little Rock, Arkansas
12	Jamaal Calvin	Guard	6–1	181	Junior	Chattanooga, Tennessee
13	Trey Kellum	Forward	6–7	215	RS–Junior	Peoria, Illinois
23	Kyle Gullett	Forward	6–6	205	Freshman	Paintsville, Kentucky
25	Ladarius Coleman	Guard/Forward	6–5	200	Sophomore	Memphis, Tennessee
33	J.T. Jones	Guard	6–3	200	Sophomore	Sikeston, Missouri

== Schedule ==
Date time, TV	Opponent	Result	Record	Site (attendance) city, state
Exhibition
11/07/2015*; 2:00 pm	Missouri S&T	W 93–64		Show Me Center (1,236); Cape Girardeau, Missouri
Regular season
11/13/2015*; 7:00 pm	at Dayton	L 53–84	0–1	UD Arena (13,216); Dayton, Ohio
11/15/2015*; 2:00 pm	at Evansville	L 65–80	0–2	Ford Center (3,893); Evansville, Indiana
11/19/2015*; 7:00 pm	at Alabama A&M	L 56–74	0–3	Elmore Gymnasium (2,300); Huntsville, Alabama
11/24/2015*; 7:00 pm	at Texas–Rio Grande Valley	L 74–83	0–4	UTRGV Fieldhouse (1,003); Edinburg, Texas
11/28/2015*; 2:00 pm	Loyola Marymount	L 60–73	0–5	Show Me Center (924); Cape Girardeau, Missouri
12/02/2015*; 7:05 pm	at Southern Illinois	L 50–74	0–6	SIU Arena (4,781); Carbondale, Illinois
12/05/2015*; 6:00 pm, CBSSN	at Memphis	L 65–80	0–7	FedEx Forum (11,453); Memphis, Tennessee
12/08/2015*; 7:00 pm	Bowling Green	L 52–79	0–8	Show Me Center (1,325); Cape Girardeau, Missouri
12/12/2015*; 2:00 pm, ASN	Ole Miss	L 64–75	0–9	Show Me Center (2,325); Cape Girardeau, Missouri
12/19/2015*; 6:00 pm	at Northern Kentucky	L 69–79	0–10	BB&T Arena (2,096); Highland Heights, Kentucky
12/22/2015*; 7:05 pm	at Missouri State	W 78–74	1–10	JQH Arena (4,189); Springfield, Missouri
12/27/2015*; 2:00 pm	Harris–Stowe	W 94–84	2–10	Show Me Center (1,025); Cape Girardeau, Missouri
12/31/2015; 12:00 pm	Belmont	L 82–92	2–11 (0–1)	Show Me Center (1,135); Cape Girardeau, Missouri
01/02/2016; 4:15 pm	Tennessee State	L 66–72	2–12 (0–2)	Show Me Center (1,168); Cape Girardeau, Missouri
01/07/2016; 5:00 pm	at Morehead State	L 69–96	2–13 (0–3)	Ellis Johnson Arena (2,010); Morehead, Kentucky
01/09/2016; 1:00 pm	at Eastern Kentucky	L 69–88	2–14 (0–4)	McBrayer Arena (1,700); Richmond, Kentucky
01/13/2016; 7:45 pm	Jacksonville State	L 60–74	2–15 (0–5)	Show Me Center (1,275); Cape Girardeau, Missouri
01/16/2016; 7:30 pm	at Tennessee Tech	L 55–91	2–16 (0–6)	Eblen Center (2,386); Cookeville, Tennessee
01/19/2016; 7:00 pm	Hannibal–LaGrange	W 84–61	3–16	Show Me Center (625); Cape Girardeau, Missouri
01/23/2016; 4:15 pm	Tennessee–Martin	W 68–60 ^{OT}	4–16 (1–6)	Show Me Center (1,246); Cape Girardeau, Missouri
01/28/2016; 8:00 pm, CBSSN	at SIU Edwardsville	W 58–51	5–16 (2–6)	Vadalabene Center (1,775); Edwardsville, Illinois
01/30/2016; 4:15 pm	Austin Peay	L 80–86	5–17 (2–7)	Show Me Center (2,615); Cape Girardeau, Missouri
02/04/2016; 8:00 pm, ESPNU	Murray State	L 72–78	5–18 (2–8)	Show Me Center (2,332); Cape Girardeau, Missouri
02/06/2016; 11:00 am, ASN	at Eastern Illinois	L 69–78	5–19 (2–9)	Lantz Arena (1,317); Charleston, Illinois
02/11/2016; 6:00 pm	at Tennessee–Martin	L 64–77	5–20 (2–10)	Skyhawk Arena (1,497); Martin, Tennessee
02/13/2016; 7:00 pm	at Murray State	L 56–83	5–21 (2–11)	CFSB Center (3,569); Murray, Kentucky
02/18/2016; 7:00 pm	SIU Edwardsville	L 69–72	5–22 (2–12)	Show Me Center (1,705); Cape Girardeau, Missouri
02/20/2016; 4:15 pm	Eastern Illinois	L 68–71	5–23 (2–13)	Show Me Center (2,142); Cape Girardeau, Missouri
02/27/2016; 7:00 pm	at Austin Peay	L 75–83	5–24 (2–14)	Dunn Center (3,109); Cookeville, Tennessee
*Non-conference game. ^{#}Rankings from AP Poll. (#) Tournament seedings in parentheses. All times are in Central Time.
