= 2015–16 UT Martin Skyhawks men's basketball team =

American college basketball season

2015–16 UT Martin Skyhawks men's basketball

OVC West Division co–champions

CIT, Second round
- Conference: Ohio Valley Conference
- West Division
- Record: 20–15 (10–6 OVC)
- Head coach: Heath Schroyer (2nd season)
- Assistant coaches: Anthony Stewart; Jermaine Johnson; John Aiken
- Home arena: Skyhawk Arena

2015–16 Ohio Valley Conference men's basketball standings
	Conf.				Overall
Team	W		L	PCT	W		L	PCT
East
Belmont	12	–	4	.750	20	–	12	.625
Tennessee State	11	–	5	.688	20	–	11	.645
Tennessee Tech	11	–	5	.688	19	–	12	.613
Morehead State	11	–	5	.688	23	–	14	.622
Eastern Kentucky	6	–	10	.375	15	–	16	.484
Jacksonville State	4	–	12	.250	8	–	23	.258
West
UT Martin	10	–	6	.625	20	–	15	.571
Murray State	10	–	6	.625	17	–	14	.548
Eastern Illinois	9	–	7	.563	13	–	17	.433
Austin Peay †	7	–	9	.438	18	–	18	.500
SIU Edwardsville	3	–	13	.188	6	–	22	.214
Southeast Missouri St.	2	–	14	.125	5	–	24	.172
† 2016 OVC tournament winner

The 2015–16 UT Martin Skyhawks men's basketball team represented the University of Tennessee at Martin during the 2015–16 NCAA Division I men's basketball season. The Skyhawks, led by second year head coach Heath Schroyer, played their home games at Skyhawk Arena and were members of the West Division of the Ohio Valley Conference. They finished the season 20–15, 10–6 in OVC play to share the West Division championship with Murray State. They defeated Morehead State to advance to the championship game of the OVC tournament where they lost to Austin Peay. They were invited to the CollegeInsider.com Tournament where they defeated Central Michigan in the first round before losing in the second round to Ball State.

Following the season, head coach Heath Schroyer left UT Martin to become an assistant at NC State.

== Previous season ==
The Skyhawks finished the 2014–15 season 21–13, 10–6 in OVC play to finish in second place in the West Division. They lost in the quarterfinals of the OVC tournament to Morehead State. They were invited to the CollegeInsider.com Tournament where they defeated Northwestern State in the first round, USC Upstate in the second round, and Eastern Kentucky in the quarterfinals. In the CIT semifinals, they lost to Evansville.

== Roster ==
2015–16 UT Martin Skyhawks men's basketball team
Players
Coaches

Pos.	#	Name	Height	Weight	Year	Previous school	Hometown
G	0	Richard Lee	6 ft 4 in (1.93 m)	200 lb (91 kg)	So	Northeast HS	Fort Lauderdale, Florida
G	1	Matthew Butler	6 ft 2 in (1.88 m)	185 lb (84 kg)	Jr	Rhode Island	Memphis, Tennessee
G	2	Jacolby Mobley	6 ft 0 in (1.83 m)	160 lb (73 kg)	Jr	Chattanooga	Starkville, Mississippi
G	3	Alex Anderson	5 ft 11 in (1.8 m)	180 lb (82 kg)	Sr	Itawamba CC	Memphis, Tennessee
F	4	Kedar Edwards	6 ft 5 in (1.96 m)	200 lb (91 kg)	Jr	State Fair CC	Brooklyn, New York
F	10	Chandler Rowe	6 ft 7 in (2.01 m)	205 lb (93 kg)	Jr	North Central HS	Atlanta
G	11	Terrence Durham	6 ft 3 in (1.91 m)	195 lb (88 kg)	RS Sr	South Plains College	Memphis, Tennessee
F	12	Fatodd Lewis	6 ft 8 in (2.03 m)	215 lb (98 kg)	RS Fr	Raleigh-Egypt HS	Memphis, Tennessee
G	13	Malik Pugh	6 ft 1 in (1.85 m)	165 lb (75 kg)	So	UNC Wilmington	Dyersburg, Tennessee
F	21	Malik London	6 ft 8 in (2.03 m)	190 lb (86 kg)	Jr	Missouri State-West Plains	Jackson Hamlet, North Carolina
F	25	Javier Martinez	6 ft 7 in (2.01 m)	210 lb (95 kg)	Jr	St. Louis Christian Academy	St. Croix, Virgin Islands
F	30	Twymond Howard	6 ft 6 in (1.98 m)	210 lb (95 kg)	Sr	Southwest Mississippi CC	Pearl, Mississippi
F	33	Myles Taylor	6 ft 7 in (2.01 m)	250 lb (113 kg)	RS Sr	Hall HS	Little Rock, Arkansas
G	41	Jalen Variste	5 ft 11 in (1.8 m)	165 lb (75 kg)	Jr	Western Texas College	Baton Rouge, Louisiana
C	44	Nick Detlev	7 ft 2 in (2.18 m)	225 lb (102 kg)	RS Fr	Andrews Osborne Academy	Euclid, Ohio

Head coach

- Heath Schroyer (Armstrong Atlantic State)

Assistant coach(es)

- Anthony Stewart (Mount Union)
- Jermaine Johnson (United States Sports Academy)
- John Aiken (Southern Maine))

Legend

- (C) Team captain
- (S) Suspended
- (I) Ineligible
- (W) Walk-on
- Injured
- Current redshirt

Roster

== Schedule ==
Date time, TV	Opponent	Result	Record	Site (attendance) city, state
Exhibition
11/09/2015*; 7:30 pm	Blue Mountain	W 72–39		Skyhawk Arena (948); Martin, Tennessee
Non–Conference Regular Season
11/13/2015*; 7:00 pm, FSOK+	at Oklahoma State	L 57–91	0–1	Gallagher-Iba Arena (4,972); Stillwater, Oklahoma
11/16/2015*; 7:30 pm	Bethune-Cookman	L 79–86	0–2	Skyhawk Arena (1,108); Martin, Tennessee
11/20/2015*; 12:00 pm	vs. Oral Roberts; Men Against Breast Cancer Classic	L 66–70	0–3	JMU Convocation Center (2,457); Harrisonburg, Virginia
11/21/2015*; 6:30 pm	vs. FIU; Men Against Breast Cancer Classic	L 62–69	0–4	JMU Convocation Center (2,628); Harrisonburg, Virginia
11/22/2015*; 2:30 pm	at James Madison; Men Against Breast Cancer Classic	W 78–75	1–4	JMU Convocation Center (2,295); Harrisonburg, Virginia
11/25/2015*; 4:00 pm	Harris–Stowe; Men Against Breast Cancer Classic	W 83–57	2–4	Skyhawk Arena (712); Martin, Tennessee
11/28/2015*; 12:00 pm	at Mississippi State	L 51–76	2–5	Humphrey Coliseum (7,150); Starkville, Mississippi
12/01/2015*; 7:05 pm	at UMKC	L 70–74	2–6	Municipal Auditorium (798); Kansas City, Missouri
12/09/2015*; 8:00 pm	at Texas Tech	L 49–69	2–7	United Spirit Arena (5,767); Lubbock, Texas
12/11/2015*; 7:00 pm	at Texas–Rio Grande Valley	W 72–64	3–7	UTRGV Fieldhouse (1,169); Edinburg, Texas
12/16/2015*; 7:00 pm	at Saint Louis	W 82–76	4–7	Chaifetz Arena (5,243); St. Louis, Missouri
12/18/2015*; 6:00 pm	Arkansas State	W 74–70	5–7	Skyhawk Arena (811); Martin, Tennessee
12/21/2015*; 6:00 pm	Alcorn State	W 70–47	6–7	Skyhawk Arena (904); Martin, Tennessee
12/29/2015*; 11:00 am	at Florida Atlantic	W 57–48	7–7	FAU Arena (837); Boca Raton, Florida
01/02/2016*; 6:00 pm	Boyce	W 122–60	8–7	Skyhawk Arena (1,079); Martin, Tennessee
Ohio Valley Conference Regular Season
01/07/2016; 7:00 pm	at Eastern Kentucky	W 78–70	9–7 (1–0)	McBrayer Arena (1,300); Richmond, Kentucky
01/09/2016; 5:00 pm	at Morehead State	L 58–64	9–8 (1–1)	Ellis Johnson Arena (3,045); Morehead, Kentucky
01/13/2016; 6:00 pm	Tennessee Tech	W 96–90	10–8 (2–1)	Skyhawk Arena (1,497); Martin, Tennessee
01/16/2016; 12:00 pm	at Jacksonville State	L 60–82	10–9 (2–2)	Pete Mathews Coliseum (1,009); Jacksonville, Alabama
01/21/2016; 8:00 pm, ESPNU	Belmont	L 72–82	10–10 (2–3)	Skyhawk Arena (3,598); Martin, Tennessee
01/24/2016; 4:15 pm	at Southeast Missouri State	L 60–68 ^{OT}	10–11 (2–4)	Show Me Center (1,246); Cape Girardeau, Missouri
01/28/2016; 7:00 pm	at Eastern Illinois	L 74–82	10–12 (2–5)	Lantz Arena (1,339); Charleston, Illinois
01/30/2016; 3:00 pm, CBSSN	Murray State	W 63–59	11–12 (3–5)	Skyhawk Arena (3,407); Martin, Tennessee
02/04/2016; 6:00 pm	Austin Peay	W 86–77	12–12 (4–5)	Skyhawk Arena (1,626); Martin, Tennessee
02/06/2016; 5:00 pm	at SIU Edwardsville	W 79–62	13–12 (5–5)	Vadalabene Center (1,362); Edwardsville, Illinois
02/11/2016; 6:00 pm	Southeast Missouri State	W 77–64	14–12 (6–5)	Skyhawk Arena (1,497); Martin, Tennessee
02/13/2016; 7:30 pm	at Austin Peay	W 85–84 ^{OT}	15–12 (7–5)	Dunn Center (2,599); Clarksville, Tennessee
02/18/2016; 6:00 pm	Eastern Illinois	W 87–84 ^{OT}	16–12 (8–5)	Skyhawk Arena (1,709); Martin, Tennessee
02/20/2016; 6:00 pm	SIU Edwardsville	W 68–51	17–12 (9–5)	Skyhawk Arena (2,471); Martin, Tennessee
02/25/2016; 6:00 pm	Tennessee State	W 72–56	18–12 (10–5)	Skyhawk Arena (2,072); Martin, Tennessee
02/27/2016; 7:00 pm	at Murray State	L 55–79	18–13 (10–6)	CFSB Center (5,412); Murray, Kentucky
Ohio Valley Conference tournament
03/04/2016; 8:30 pm, ESPNU	vs. Morehead State; Semifinals	W 83–70	19–13	Nashville Municipal Auditorium (2,167); Nashville, Tennessee
03/05/2016; 5:00 pm, ESPN2	vs. Austin Peay; Championship game	L 73–83	19–14	Nashville Municipal Auditorium (2,068); Nashville, Tennessee
CIT
03/16/2016*; 7:00 pm	at Central Michigan; First round	W 76–73	20–14	McGuirk Arena (832); Mount Pleasant, Michigan
03/20/2016*; 5:00 pm	at Ball State; Second round	L 80–83 ^{OT}	20–15	Worthen Arena (1,203); Muncie, Indiana
*Non-conference game. ^{#}Rankings from AP Poll. (#) Tournament seedings in parentheses. All times are in Central Time.
