= 2015–16 Tennessee Tech Golden Eagles men's basketball team =

American college basketball season

2015–16 Tennessee Tech Golden Eagles men's basketball

Vegas 16, Quarterfinals
- Conference: Ohio Valley Conference
- East Division
- Record: 19–12 (11–5 OVC)
- Head coach: Steve Payne (5th season)
- Assistant coaches: Rick Cabrera; Frank Davis; Jason Taylor
- Home arena: Eblen Center

2015–16 Ohio Valley Conference men's basketball standings
	Conf.				Overall
Team	W		L	PCT	W		L	PCT
East
Belmont	12	–	4	.750	20	–	12	.625
Tennessee State	11	–	5	.688	20	–	11	.645
Tennessee Tech	11	–	5	.688	19	–	12	.613
Morehead State	11	–	5	.688	23	–	14	.622
Eastern Kentucky	6	–	10	.375	15	–	16	.484
Jacksonville State	4	–	12	.250	8	–	23	.258
West
UT Martin	10	–	6	.625	20	–	15	.571
Murray State	10	–	6	.625	17	–	14	.548
Eastern Illinois	9	–	7	.563	13	–	17	.433
Austin Peay †	7	–	9	.438	18	–	18	.500
SIU Edwardsville	3	–	13	.188	6	–	22	.214
Southeast Missouri St.	2	–	14	.125	5	–	24	.172
† 2016 OVC tournament winner

The 2015–16 Tennessee Tech Golden Eagles men's basketball team represented Tennessee Technological University during the 2015–16 NCAA Division I men's basketball season. The Golden Eagles, led by fifth-year head coach Steve Payne, played their home games at the Eblen Center and were members of the East Division of the Ohio Valley Conference. They finished the season 19–12, 11–5 in OVC play to finish in a three-way tie for second place in the East Division. They lost in the first round of the OVC tournament to Austin Peay. They were invited to the inaugural Vegas 16, which only had eight teams, where they lost in the quarterfinals to Old Dominion.

== Roster ==
Number	Name	Position	Height	Weight	Year	Hometown
0	Shirmane Thomas	Guard	6–2	175	Junior	Homer, Louisiana
1	Markell Henderson	Guard	6–5	195	Junior	Boswell, Oklahoma
2	Hakeem Rogers	Guard	6–1	175	Junior	Elizabeth, New Jersey
4	Aleksa Jugovic	Guard	6–3	185	Sophomore	Leskovac, Serbia
11	Micaiah Henry	Center	6–8	230	Freshman	Decatur, Georgia
12	Torrance Rowe	Guard	6–1	175	Senior	Atlanta
13	Ryan Martin	Forward	6–9	225	Junior	London, England
20	Savonte Frazier	Guard	6–1	180	RS freshman	Lake Wales, Florida
21	Conner Hall	Guard	6–3	195	Freshman	Gainesboro, Tennessee
22	Courtney Alexander	Forward	6–7	195	Freshman	Mableton, Georgia
23	Josiah Moore	Guard	6–5	215	RS senior	Atlanta
25	Mason Ramsey	Forward	6–6	220	RS sophomore	Livingston, Tennessee
35	Anthony Morse	Forward	6–9	230	Senior	Lawrenceville, Georgia

== Schedule ==
Date time, TV	Opponent	Result	Record	Site (attendance) city, state
Non-conference regular season
11/14/2015*; 7:30 pm	Piedmont College	W 110–72	1–0	Eblen Center (1,615); Cookeville, Tennessee
11/16/2015*; 8:00 pm	at Air Force; Air Force Classic	L 70–80	1–1	Clune Arena (488); Colorado Springs, Colorado
11/18/2015*; 8:00 pm	at New Mexico State; Air Force Classic	L 63–76	1–2	Pan American Center (4,104); Las Cruces, New Mexico
11/24/2015*; 6:00 pm	Jackson State	W 86–82 ^{OT}	2–2	Eblen Center (779); Cookeville, Tennessee
11/27/2015*; 6:00 pm	Robert Morris; Air Force Classic	W 85–72	3–2	Eblen Center (760); Cookeville, Tennessee
11/28/2015*; 5:30 pm	UC Clermont	W 91–66	4–2	Eblen Center (755); Cookeville, Tennessee
11/29/2015*; 2:00 pm	Mississippi Valley State; Air Force Classic	W 101–64	5–2	Eblen Center (605); Cookeville, Tennessee
12/02/2015*; 6:00 pm	East Tennessee State	W 63–61	6–2	Eblen Center (1,011); Cookeville, Tennessee
12/05/2015*; 4:00 pm, ESPN3	at Lipscomb	W 81–78	7–2	Allen Arena (1,620); Nashville, Tennessee
12/12/2015*; 7:00 pm, SECN	at Arkansas	L 57–83	7–3	Bud Walton Arena (14,336); Fayetteville, Arkansas
12/15/2015*; 6:00 pm	at Chattanooga	L 69–80	7–4	McKenzie Arena (2,500); Chattanooga, Tennessee
12/18/2015*; 7:30 pm	Miami (OH)	W 77–64	8–4	Eblen Center (1,378); Cookeville, Tennessee
12/22/2015*; 7:30 pm, ESPN3	at Iowa	L 63–85	8–5	Carver–Hawkeye Arena (14,432); Iowa City, Iowa
Ohio Valley Conference regular season
12/31/2015; 3:00 pm	Eastern Illinois	W 94–84	9–5 (1–0)	Eblen Center (1,272); Cookeville, Tennessee
01/02/2016; 7:30 pm	SIU Edwardsville	W 86–63	10–5 (2–0)	Eblen Center (1,581); Cookeville, Tennessee
01/07/2016; 7:00 pm	at Murray State	W 71–65	11–5 (3–0)	CFSB Center (3,063); Murray, Kentucky
01/09/2016; 7:00 pm	at Austin Peay	W 72–66	12–5 (4–0)	Dunn Center (1,585); Clarksville, Tennessee
01/13/2016; 6:00 pm	at Tennessee–Martin	L 90–96	12–6 (4–1)	Skyhawk Arena (1,497); Martin, Tennessee
01/16/2016; 7:30 pm	Southeast Missouri State	W 91–55	13–6 (5–1)	Eblen Center (2,386); Cookeville, Tennessee
01/21/2016; 6:00 pm	at Morehead State	L 74–81	13–7 (5–2)	Ellis Johnson Arena (2,735); Morehead, Kentucky
01/23/2016; 1:00 pm	at Eastern Kentucky	W 89–83	14–7 (6–2)	McBrayer Arena (1,050); Richmond, Kentucky
01/28/2016; 8:00 pm, ASN	Tennessee State	W 81–79	15–7 (7–2)	Eblen Center (2,146); Cookeville, Tennessee
01/30/2016; 7:30 pm	Belmont	W 89–79	16–7 (8–2)	Eblen Center (4,428); Cookeville, Tennessee
02/06/2016; 4:30 pm	at Jacksonville State	W 68–58	17–7 (9–2)	Pete Mathews Coliseum (1,248); Jacksonville, Alabama
02/10/2016; 7:30 pm	at Tennessee State	L 55–85	17–8 (9–3)	Gentry Complex (2,554); Nashville, Tennessee
02/13/2016; 7:30 pm	Jacksonville State	W 72–70	18–8 (10–3)	Eblen Center (3,611); Cookeville, Tennessee
02/20/2016; 5:00 pm	at Belmont	L 86–95	18–9 (10–4)	Curb Event Center (5,074); Nashville, Tennessee
02/25/2016; 6:00 pm	Morehead State	L 59–69	18–10 (10–5)	Eblen Center (2,567); Cookeville, Tennessee
02/27/2016; 1:00 pm	Eastern Kentucky	W 92–82	19–10 (11–5)	Eblen Center (3,078); Cookeville, Tennessee
Ohio Valley Conference tournament
03/02/2016; 6:00 pm	vs. Austin Peay	L 72–92	19–11	Nashville Municipal Auditorium (1,122); Nashville, Tennessee
Vegas 16
03/28/2016*; 2:00 pm, CBSSN	vs. Old Dominion; Quarterfinals	L 59–75	19–12	Mandalay Bay Events Center; Paradise, Nevada
*Non-conference game. (#) Tournament seedings in parentheses. All times are in Central Time.
