= 2015–16 Eastern Kentucky Colonels men's basketball team =

American college basketball season

2015–16 Eastern Kentucky Colonels men's basketball
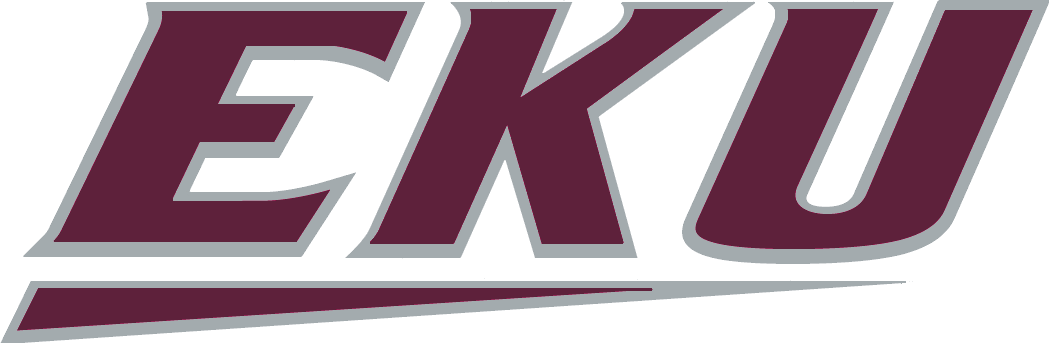
- Conference: Ohio Valley Conference
- East Division
- Record: 15–16 (6–10 OVC)
- Head coach: Dan McHale (1st season)
- Assistant coaches: Michael Bradley; Reece Gaines; Doug Davenport
- Home arena: McBrayer Arena

2015–16 Ohio Valley Conference men's basketball standings
	Conf.				Overall
Team	W		L	PCT	W		L	PCT
East
Belmont	12	–	4	.750	20	–	12	.625
Tennessee State	11	–	5	.688	20	–	11	.645
Tennessee Tech	11	–	5	.688	19	–	12	.613
Morehead State	11	–	5	.688	23	–	14	.622
Eastern Kentucky	6	–	10	.375	15	–	16	.484
Jacksonville State	4	–	12	.250	8	–	23	.258
West
UT Martin	10	–	6	.625	20	–	15	.571
Murray State	10	–	6	.625	17	–	14	.548
Eastern Illinois	9	–	7	.563	13	–	17	.433
Austin Peay †	7	–	9	.438	18	–	18	.500
SIU Edwardsville	3	–	13	.188	6	–	22	.214
Southeast Missouri St.	2	–	14	.125	5	–	24	.172
† 2016 OVC tournament winner

The 2015–16 Eastern Kentucky Colonels basketball team represented Eastern Kentucky University during the 2015–16 NCAA Division I men's basketball season. The Colonels, led by first year head coach Dan McHale, played their home games at McBrayer Arena within Alumni Coliseum and were members of the East Division of the Ohio Valley Conference. They finished the season 15–16, 6–10 in OVC play to finish in fourth place in the East Division. They failed to qualify for the OVC tournament.

== Roster ==
Number	Name	Position	Height	Weight	Year	Hometown
0	Dujuanta Weaver	Guard	5–10	170	Freshman	Louisville, Kentucky
1	Greg King	Forward/Center	6–7	230	Sophomore	Ellenwood, Georgia
2	Paul Jackson	Guard	6–1	178	Sophomore	Lithonia, Georgia
3	Cam Williams	Guard	6–0	177	Junior	Omaha, Nebraska
4	Tommy Matthews	Guard	6–1	180	Senior	Clinton, Maryland
5	Isaac McGlone	Guard	6–2	178	Junior	Lancaster, Ohio
10	Nick Mayo	Forward	6–9	220	Freshman	Oakland, Maine
11	Jaylen Babb-Harrison	Guard	6–2	187	RS–Junior	Ajax, Ontario, Canada
14	Daniel Parke	Guard	6–1	165	RS–Sophomore	Richmond, Kentucky
21	JaVontae Hawkins	Guard	6–5	211	RS–Junior	Flint, Michigan
23	Jonathan Hood	Guard	6–4	206	Senior	Durham, North Carolina
24	K.J. Bluford	Guard	6–1	185	RS–Junior	Minneapolis
25	Oliver Bishop	Guard	6–0	160	Freshman	Chicago, Illinois
30	Jarelle Reischell	Forward	6–7	210	Senior	Frankfurt, Germany
32	Ja'Mill Powell	Guard	6–7	180	Senior	Bridgeport, Connecticut
33	Anthony Pratt Jr.	Forward	6–7	210	Freshman	Nassau, Bahamas

== Schedule ==
Date time, TV	Opponent	Result	Record	Site (attendance) city, state
Exhibition
11/08/2015*; 4:30 pm	Union (KY)	W 97–66		McBrayer Arena (1,200); Richmond, Kentucky
Regular season
11/13/2015*; 7:00 pm	Coppin State	W 107–80	1–0	McBrayer Arena (2,300); Richmond, Kentucky
11/16/2015*; 7:00 pm	at UNC Wilmington	L 59–78	1–1	Trask Coliseum (3,585); Wilmington, North Carolina
11/20/2015*; 6:00 pm	Ball State @EKUHoops Classic	W 89–81	2–1	McBrayer Arena (2,150); Richmond, Kentucky
11/21/2015*; 2:00 pm	South Carolina State @EKUHoops Classic	W 92–82	3–1	McBrayer Arena (1,700); Richmond, Kentucky
11/22/2015*; 2:00 pm	Longwood @EKUHoops Classic	W 110–97	4–1	McBrayer Arena (1,400); Richmond, Kentucky
11/25/2015*; 2:00 pm	Thomas More	W 101–67	5–1	McBrayer Arena (1,050); Richmond, Kentucky
11/28/2015*; 2:00 pm	Southern Utah	W 98–85	6–1	McBrayer Arena (1,300); Richmond, Kentucky
12/01/2015*; 8:00 pm, FCS	at WKU	L 84–86	6–2	E. A. Diddle Arena (4,026); Bowling Green, Kentucky
12/05/2015*; 8:00 pm	at Savannah State	W 74–71	7–2	Tiger Arena (1,020); Savannah, Georgia
12/09/2015*; 7:00 pm, ESPN2	at No. 5 Kentucky	L 67–88	7–3	Rupp Arena (22,544); Lexington, Kentucky
12/12/2015*; 7:00 pm	at Marshall	L 72–96	7–4	Cam Henderson Center (4,553); Huntington, West Virginia
12/15/2015*; 7:00 pm	Florida Atlantic	W 80–73	8–4	McBrayer Arena (1,250); Richmond, Kentucky
12/18/2015*; 7:00 pm	at East Tennessee State	L 81–87	8–5	Freedom Hall Civic Center (2,453); Johnson City, Tennessee
12/21/2015*; 7:00 pm, ESPNU	at No. 19 West Virginia	L 59–84	8–6	WVU Coliseum (8,121); Morgantown, West Virginia
12/29/2015*; 2:00 pm	Manhattan	W 76–64	9–6	McBrayer Arena (1,150); Richmond, Kentucky
Ohio Valley Conference regular season
01/02/2016; 7:00 pm	at Austin Peay	W 79–70	10–6 (1–0)	Dunn Center (1,617); Clarksville, Tennessee
01/07/2016; 8:00 pm	UT Martin	L 70–78	10–7 (1–1)	McBrayer Arena (1,300); Richmond, Kentucky
01/09/2016; 2:00 pm	Southeast Missouri State	W 88–69	11–7 (2–1)	McBrayer Arena (1,700); Richmond, Kentucky
01/14/2016; 9:00 pm, CBSSN	at Eastern Illinois	L 85–97	11–8 (2–2)	Lantz Arena (1,277); Charleston, Illinois
01/16/2016; 1:00 pm	at SIU Edwardsville	L 65–67	11–9 (2–3)	Vadalabene Center (1,650); Edwardsville, Illinois
01/21/2016; 7:00 pm	Jacksonville State	W 91–88	12–9 (3–3)	McBrayer Arena (2,700); Richmond, Kentucky
01/23/2016; 2:00 pm	Tennessee Tech	L 83–89	12–10 (3–4)	McBrayer Arena (1,050); Richmond, Kentucky
01/27/2016; 8:00 pm	Murray State	L 71–75	12–11 (3–5)	McBrayer Arena (2,700); Richmond, Kentucky
01/30/2016; 7:00 pm	Morehead State	L 67–70	12–12 (3–6)	McBrayer Arena (3,900); Richmond, Kentucky
02/04/2016; 7:00 pm	at Tennessee State	W 97–81	13–12 (4–6)	Gentry Complex (1,552); Nashville, Tennessee
02/06/2016; 5:00 pm	at Belmont	W 88–78	14–12 (5–6)	Curb Event Center (2,286); Nashville, Tennessee
02/11/2016; 7:00 pm, CBSSN	at Morehead State	L 50–61	14–13 (5–7)	Ellis Johnson Arena (4,214); Morehead, Kentucky
02/13/2016; 2:00 pm	Tennessee State	L 78–79	14–14 (5–8)	McBrayer Arena (2,700); Richmond, Kentucky
02/18/2016; 9:00 pm, ESPNU	Belmont	L 78–86	14–15 (5–9)	McBrayer Arena (4,200); Richmond, Kentucky
02/25/2016; 8:00 pm	at Jacksonville State	W 76–54	15–15 (6–9)	Pete Mathews Coliseum (821); Jacksonville, Alabama
02/27/2016; 1:00 pm	at Tennessee Tech	L 82–92	15–16 (6–10)	Eblen Center (3,078); Cookeville, Tennessee
*Non-conference game. ^{#}Rankings from AP Poll. (#) Tournament seedings in parentheses. All times are in Eastern Time.
