= 2015–16 SIU Edwardsville Cougars men's basketball team =

American college basketball season

2015–16 SIU Edwardsville Cougars men's basketball
- Conference: Ohio Valley Conference
- West Division
- Record: 6–22 (3–13 OVC)
- Head coach: Jon Harris (1st season)
- Assistant coaches: Kent Williams; Tarrance Crump; Bubba Wells
- Home arena: Vadalabene Center

2015–16 Ohio Valley Conference men's basketball standings
	Conf.				Overall
Team	W		L	PCT	W		L	PCT
East
Belmont	12	–	4	.750	20	–	12	.625
Tennessee State	11	–	5	.688	20	–	11	.645
Tennessee Tech	11	–	5	.688	19	–	12	.613
Morehead State	11	–	5	.688	23	–	14	.622
Eastern Kentucky	6	–	10	.375	15	–	16	.484
Jacksonville State	4	–	12	.250	8	–	23	.258
West
UT Martin	10	–	6	.625	20	–	15	.571
Murray State	10	–	6	.625	17	–	14	.548
Eastern Illinois	9	–	7	.563	13	–	17	.433
Austin Peay †	7	–	9	.438	18	–	18	.500
SIU Edwardsville	3	–	13	.188	6	–	22	.214
Southeast Missouri St.	2	–	14	.125	5	–	24	.172
† 2016 OVC tournament winner

The 2015–16 SIU Edwardsville Cougars men's basketball team represented Southern Illinois University Edwardsville during the 2015–16 NCAA Division I men's basketball season. The Cougars, led by first year head coach Jon Harris, played their home games at the Vadalabene Center as members of the West Division of the Ohio Valley Conference (OVC). They finished the season 6–22, 3–13 in OVC play to finish in fifth place in the west division. They failed to qualify for the OVC tournament.

== Off-season ==
A nationwide search for a new head coach began in March, 2015, and on April 3, Edwardsville native Jon Harris, an assistant coach for the California Golden Bears was introduced as the new Cougars head coach. Harris announced the addition of assistant coaches Kent Williams and Tarrence Crump on April 24. On May 28, Charles "Bubba" Wells was also added to the staff.

== Preseason ==
Six players, all of whom saw major playing time, return from the 12–16 team of 2014–15. One recruit from high school signed by previous coach Lennox Forrester joined the team in addition to others recruited by new coach Harris and his staff, including three transfers from Southern Illinois junior colleges (one from local Lewis & Clark), a transferring graduate student with remaining eligibility, and a transfer who will be eligible after the semester break. Missing from the mix is Donovine Stewart, last season's leader in minutes played, assists, and steals and #2 in scoring and rebounding, who graduated with a year of eligibility remaining and was said to have been contacted about transferring by Illinois, Minnesota, USC, and others, with Illinois having requested his transcripts; Stewart eventually transferred to Portland State but sat out the PSU @ SIUE game on December 12.

== Season ==
The 2015–16 season will begin in mid-November, 2015.

Although the final schedule was not released until August 2, SIUE's non-conference opponents for the upcoming campaign were announced in May. The Cougars will host Saint Louis (11–21 in 2014-15), Portland State (15–14), Campbell (10–22), and Grand Canyon (17–15) at the Vadalabene Center. They will take road trips to play at USC (12–20), Butler (23–11), Northwestern (15–17), SIU Carbondale (12–21), Milwaukee (14–16), and IPFW (16–15).

Most games will be streamed online. Fox Sports Midwest will carry a package of SIUE games for the fourth consecutive season. Fox's broadcast/cablecasts of Cougars games began with five games in the 2012-2013 season, increasing to eight games in 2013-14 and nine games last season. The OVC is also has conference cablecast packages with American Sports Network and CBS Sports Network that will include Cougar games.

== Postseason ==
The Ohio Valley Conference men's and women's basketball tournaments will again return to Nashville, Tennessee and the Nashville Municipal Auditorium on March 2–5, 2016.

The 2016 NCAA Men's Division I Basketball Tournament is scheduled to begin on March 15, 2016, and will conclude with the championship game on April 4 at NRG Stadium in Houston, Texas.

== Roster ==
2015–16 SIU Edwardsville Cougars men's basketball team
Players
Coaches

Pos.	#	Name	Height	Weight	Year	Previous school	Hometown
F	0	Mike Chandler	6 ft 8 in (2.03 m)	205 lb (93 kg)	Sr	Hill College/Grovetown	Augusta, GA
G	1	Burak Eslik	6 ft 4 in (1.93 m)	185 lb (84 kg)	Jr	Lewis and Clark/Fayetteville Christian	Istanbul, Turkey
F	2	Devin Thornton	6 ft 5 in (1.96 m)	225 lb (102 kg)	Jr	Shawnee/Germantown	Memphis, TN
G	3	Tre Harris (redshirt)	6 ft 5 in (1.96 m)	195 lb (88 kg)	So	Kansas State/Edwardsville	Edwardsville, IL
G	4	CJ Carr	5 ft 7 in (1.7 m)	145 lb (66 kg)	So	Rock Island	Rock Island, IL
F/C	5	Grant Fiorentinos	6 ft 10 in (2.08 m)	225 lb (102 kg)	RS Sr	Tulane/The Hunn School	Cape Town, South Africa
G	10	Carlos Anderson	6 ft 4 in (1.93 m)	205 lb (93 kg)	Fr	Alton	Alton, IL
C	11	Glen Pierre, Jr. (redshirt)	6 ft 11 in (2.11 m)	230 lb (104 kg)	Jr	College of Charleston/Oldsmar Christian	Orlando, FL
C	12	Yemi Makanjuola	6 ft 10 in (2.08 m)	230 lb (104 kg)	GS	UNC Wilmington/Tennessee/Word of God	Lagos, Nigeria
F	13	Jake Newton	6 ft 6 in (1.98 m)	200 lb (91 kg)	Sr	Lincoln Trail/Terre Haute North	Terre Haute, IN
G	15	Josh White †	6 ft 1 in (1.85 m)	185 lb (84 kg)	RS Jr	South Dakota State/Edwardsville	Edwardsville, IL
G	23	Connor Wheeler	6 ft 2 in (1.88 m)	180 lb (82 kg)	RS Sr	John A. Logan/Du Quoin	Carbondale, IL
F	24	Jalen Henry	6 ft 8 in (2.03 m)	220 lb (100 kg)	So	Southeast	Springfield, IL
F	45	Keenan Simmons	6 ft 6 in (1.98 m)	185 lb (84 kg)	So	Michigan City	Michigan City, IN
		†=Redshirted Fall semester; Joined team mid-season	—	—

Head coach

- Jon Harris

Assistant coach(es)

- Kent Williams
- Tarrance Crump
- Bubba Wells

Legend

- (C) Team captain
- (S) Suspended
- (I) Ineligible
- (W) Walk-on
- Injured
- Current redshirt

Roster
Last update: 01/15/2017

== Schedule ==
Date time, TV	Opponent	Result	Record	High points	High rebounds	High assists	Site (attendance) city, state
Exhibition
11/09/2015*; 7:00 pm, OVC Digital Network	Fontbonne	W 80–48	—	14 – Eslik	11 – Anderson	4 – Carr	Vadalabene Center; Edwardsville, IL
Regular season
11/13/2015*; 8:00 pm, Fox Sports Midwest	Arkansas State	W 79–70	1–0	18 – Henry	9 – Henry	4 – Eslik	Vadalabene Center (1,592); Edwardsville, IL
11/17/2015*; 7:00 pm, Fox Sports Midwest	Saint Louis	L 60–70	1–1	15 – Eslik	8 – Henry	5 – Anderson	Vadalabene Center (3,931); Edwardsville, IL
11/21/2015*; 1:30 pm, Mastodon All-Access	at IPFW	L 67–87	1–2	21 – Fiorentinos	7 – Eslik	2 – Henry & Wheeler	Memorial Coliseum (1,388); Fort Wayne, IN
11/24/2015*; 7:00 pm, OVC Digital Network	Campbell	L 74–77	1–3	14 – Carr	11 – Makanjoula	4 – Carr	Vadalabene Center (1,073); Edwardsville, IL
11/28/2015*; 4:00 pm, FS2	at Butler	L 73–89	1–4	17 – Fiorentinos	6 – Anderson & Fiorentinos	3 – Anderson	Hinkle Fieldhouse (7,026); Indianapolis, IN
11/30/2015*; 7:00 pm, Fox Sports Midwest; OVC Digital Network	Green Bay	L 69–87	1–5	18 – Fiorentinos	8 – Makanjoula	4 – Eslik	Vadalabene Center (1,027); Edwardsville, IL
12/03/2015*; 6:00 pm, ESPN3	at Milwaukee	L 51–64	1–6	10 – Anderson	8 – Anderson & Simmons	2 – Anderson & Eslik	UW–Milwaukee Panther Arena (2,028); Milwaukee, WI
12/05/2015*; 2:00 pm, BTN Plus	at Northwestern	L 56–81	1–7	13 – Eslik	7 – Simmons	6 – Carr	Welsh-Ryan Arena (6,318); Evanston, IL
12/09/2015*; 7:05 pm, ESPN3	at Southern Illinois	W 76–74	2–7	23 – Eslik	5 – Team	6 – Anderson	SIU Arena (4,817); Carbondale, IL
12/12/2015*; 7:00 pm, Fox Sports Midwest; OVC Digital Network	Portland State	W 74 –64	3–7	20 – Makanjoula	9 – Makanjoula	5 – Carr	Vadalabene Center (1,268); Edwardsville, IL
12/21/2015*; 10:00 pm, Pac-12 Network	at USC	L 51–70	3–8	10 – Anderson & Henry	10 – Fiorentinos	3 – Wheeler	Galen Center (3,409); Los Angeles, CA
12/28/2015*; 7:00 pm, Fox Sports Midwest; OVC Digital Network	Grand Canyon	L 75–86	3–9	17 – Eslik	6 – Carr	6 – Carr	Vadalabene Center (1,402); Edwardsville, IL
12/31/2015; 4:30 pm, OVC Digital Network	at Jacksonville State	L 67–72	3–10 (0–1)	21 – Makanjuola	10 – Simmons	3 – Carr	Pete Mathews Coliseum (724); Jacksonville, AL
01/02/2016; 7:30 pm, OVC Digital Network	at Tennessee Tech	L 63–86	3–11 (0–2)	15 – Anderson	7 – Anderson	4 – Carr	Eblen Center (1,581); Cookeville, TN
01/06/2016; 8:00 pm, ASN	Belmont	L 77-85	3–12 (0–3)	21 – Simmons	7 – Makanjoula & Simmons	9 – Carr	Vadalabene Center (1,007); Edwardsville, IL
01/09/2016; 7:30 pm, OVC Digital Network	at Tennessee State	L 60–63	3–13 (0–4)	23 – Eslik	10 – Makanjoula	4 – Carr	Gentry Complex (1,368); Nashville, TN
01/14/2016; 8:00 pm, OVC Digital Network	Morehead State	L 67–70 ^{OT}	3–14 (0–5)	40 – Eslik	7 – Makanjoula	8 – Carr	Vadalabene Center (1,547); Edwardsville, IL
01/16/2016; 1:00 pm, Fox Sports Midwest; OVC Digital Network	Eastern Kentucky	W 67–66	4–14 (1–5)	21 – Eslik	9 – Anderson	6 – Carr	Vadalabene Center (1,650); Edwardsville, IL
01/21/2016; 7:00 pm, OVC Digital Network	at Austin Peay	L 86–90	4–15 (1–6)	22 – Eslik & Newton	13 – Makanjuola	4 – Carr	Dunn Center (1,365); Clarksville, TN
01/23/2016; 7:00 pm, OVC Digital Network	at Murray State	L 54–70	4–16 (1–7)	8 – Anderson, Carr, Fiorentinos, Simmons	4 – Anderson, Makanjoula, Simmons	2 – Wheeler	CFSB Center (3,011); Murray, KY
01/28/2016; 8:00 pm, CBSN; OVC Digital Network	Southeast Missouri State	L 51–58	4–17 (1–8)	16 – Eslik	6 – Team	2 – Anderson, Newton, White	Vadalabene Center (1,775); Edwardsville, IL
01/30/2016; 5:00 pm, Fox Sports Midwest; OVC Digital Network	Eastern Illinois	L 40–55	4–18 (1–9)	10 – Anderson, White	11 – Anderson	2 – Anderson, Chandler	Vadalabene Center (2,008); Edwardsville, IL
02/06/2016; 5:00 pm, OVC Digital Network	UT–Martin	W 79–62	4–19 (1–10)	15 – Newton	4 – Eslik, Makanjoula, Simmons	6 – Anderson	Vadalabene Center (1,362); Edwardsville, IL
02/11/2015; 7:00 pm, Fox Sports Midwest; OVC Digital Network	Murray State	L 64–70	4–20 (1–11)	13 – Carr	4 – Carr	4 – Anderson	Vadalabene Center (2,007); Edwardsville, IL
02/13/2016; 7:00 pm, OVC Digital Network	at Eastern Illinois	W 72–64	5–20 (2–11)	29 – Eslik	8 – Chandler	2 – Carr, Chandler	Lantz Arena (1,469); Charleston, IL
02/18/2016; 7:00 pm, OVC Digital Network	at Southeast Missouri	W 72–69	6–20 (3–11)	24 – Eslik	5 – Makanjoula	7 – Carr	Show Me Center (1,705); Cape Girardeau, MO
02/20/2016; 6:00 pm, OVC Digital Network	at UT–Martin	L 51–68	6–21 (3–12)	17 – Anderson	6 – Chandler	5 – Anderson	Skyhawk Arena (2,471); Martin, TN
02/25/2016; 7:00 pm, OVC Digital Network	Austin Peay	L 75–80	6–22 (3–13)	17 – Newton	10 – Simmons	5 – Carr	Vadalabene Center (1,647); Edwardsville, IL
*Non-conference game. ^{#}Rankings from AP Poll. (#) Tournament seedings in parentheses. All times are in Central Time.
