= Murray State Racers men's basketball statistical leaders =

The Murray State Racers men's basketball statistical leaders are individual statistical leaders of the Murray State Racers men's basketball program in various categories, including points, assists, blocks, rebounds, and steals. Within those areas, the lists identify single-game, single-season, and career leaders. The Racers represent Murray State University in the NCAA Division I Missouri Valley Conference.

Murray State began competing in intercollegiate basketball in 1925. However, the school's record book does not generally list records from before the 1950s, as records from before this period are often incomplete and inconsistent. Since scoring was much lower in this era, and teams played much fewer games during a typical season, it is likely that few or no players from this era would appear on these lists anyway.

The NCAA did not officially record assists as a stat until the 1983–84 season, and blocks and steals until the 1985–86 season, but Murray State's record books includes players in these stats before these seasons. These lists are updated through the end of the 2022 OVC tournament.

== Scoring ==
Career
Rk	Player	Points	Seasons
1	Jeff Martin	2,484	1985–86 1986–87 1987–88 1988–89
2	Isaac Spencer	2,248	1997–98 1998–99 1999–00 2000–01
3	Marcus Brown	2,236	1992–93 1993–94 1994–95 1995–96
4	Popeye Jones	2,057	1988–89 1989–90 1990–91 1991–92
5	Isaiah Canaan	2,050	2009–10 2010–11 2011–12 2012–13
6	Howie Crittenden	2,019	1952–53 1953–54 1954–55 1955–56
7	Tevin Brown	1,915	2018–19 2019–20 2020–21 2021–22
8	Lamont Sleets	1,902	1979–80 1980–81 1981–82 1982–83 1983–84
9	Vincent Rainey	1,888	1993–94 1994–95 1995–96 1996–97
10	Frank Allen	1,811	1989–90 1990–91 1991–92 1992–93

Season
Rk	Player	Points	Season
1	Ja Morant	808	2018–19
2	Jeff Martin	806	1987–88
3	Marcus Brown	767	1995–96
4	Jeff Martin	745	1988–89
5	Jonathan Stark	723	2016–17
6	De'Teri Mayes	711	1997–98
7	Cameron Payne	707	2014–15
8	Jonathan Stark	685	2017–18
9	Isaiah Canaan	676	2012–13
10	Marcus Brown	671	1994–95

Single game
Rk	Player	Points	Season	Opponent
1	Marcus Brown	45	1995–96	Wash.-Mo
2	Herb McPherson	44	1965–66	Middle Tenn.
3	Isaac Spencer	42	2000–01	Tennessee St.
	De'Teri Mayes	42	1997–98	Arkansas
5	Jonathan Stark	41	2016–17	Tenn. Tech
	Bennie Purcell	41	1951–52	Ky. Wesleyan
7	Ja Morant	40	2018–19	SIUE
	Garrett Beshear	40	1952–53	Dayton
	Garrett Beshear	40	1952–53	Marshall
10	KJ Williams	39	2021–22	Tennessee State
	Marcus Brown	39	1995–96	Middle Tenn.
	Frank Allen	39	1992–93	Tenn. Tech
	Les Taylor	39	1972–73	Wm. Jewell

== Rebounds ==
Career
Rk	Player	Rebounds	Seasons
1	Popeye Jones	1,374	1988–89 1989–90 1990–91 1991–92
2	Dick Cunningham	1,292	1965–66 1966–67 1967–68
3	Jim Jennings	1,147	1961–62 1962–63 1963–64
4	Stewart Johnson	981	1963–64 1964–65 1965–66
5	Isaac Spencer	962	1997–98 1998–99 1999–00 2000–01
6	Cuthbert Victor	935	2000–01 2001–02 2002–03 2003–04
7	KJ Williams	888	2018–19 2019–20 2020–21 2021–22
8	Marcelous Starks	875	1971–72 1972–73 1973–74
9	Ron Johnson	837	1968–69 1969–70 1970–71
10	Antoine Whelchel	791	2000–01 2001–02 2002–03 2003–04

Season
Rk	Player	Rebounds	Season
1	Dick Cunningham	479	1966–67
2	Popeye Jones	469	1990–91
3	Popeye Jones	431	1991–92
	Jim Jennings	431	1961–62
5	Dick Cunningham	423	1967–68
6	Dick Cunningham	390	1965–66
7	Jim Jennings	377	1963–64
8	Stewart Johnson	367	1964–65
9	Melvin Deweese	360	1951–52
10	Gary Hooker	356	1979–80

Single game
Rk	Player	Rebounds	Season	Opponent
1	Popeye Jones	23	1990–91	Morehead St.
2	Popeye Jones	21	1991–92	Tenn. State
	Popeye Jones	21	1990–91	Prairie View
4	Cuthbert Victor	20	2003–04	Western Ky.
	Fred Walker	20	1995–96	Austin Peay
	Popeye Jones	20	1990–91	US International
	Popeye Jones	20	1990–91	Tenn. Tech
	Popeye Jones	20	1990–91	Southern Ill.
	Popeye Jones	20	1991–92	Middle Tenn.
10	Popeye Jones	19	1991–92	Southern Ill.
	Popeye Jones	19	1991–92	SE Missouri
	Popeye Jones	19	1991–92	Eastern Ky.
	Popeye Jones	19	1991–92	Tenn. State

== Assists ==
Career
Rk	Player	Assists	Seasons
1	Ja Morant	532	2017–18 2018–19
2	Don Mann	531	1985–86 1986–87 1987–88 1988–89
3	Lamont Sleets	458	1979–80 1980–81 1981–82 1982–83 1983–84
4	JaCobi Wood	439	2022–23 2023–24 2024–25
5	Glen Green	423	1979–80 1980–81 1981–82 1982–83
6	Tevin Brown	407	2018–19 2019–20 2020–21 2021–22
7	Cameron Payne	394	2013–14 2014–15
8	Isaiah Canaan	385	2009–10 2010–11 2011–12 2012–13
9	Chad Townsend	383	1996–97 1997–98
10	Isacc Miles	374	2008–09 2009–10 2010–11

Season
Rk	Player	Assists	Season
1	Ja Morant	331	2018–19
2	Chad Townsend	212	1996–97
3	Cameron Payne	209	2014–15
4	Ja Morant	201	2017–18
5	Cameron Payne	185	2013–14
6	Justice Hill	173	2021–22
7	Jonathan Stark	172	2016–17
	Don Mann	172	1988–89
9	Chad Townsend	171	1997–98
10	JaCobi Wood	161	2024–25

Single game
Rk	Player	Assists	Season	Opponent
1	Ja Morant	18	2018–19	UT Martin
2	Ja Morant	16	2018–19	Marquette
	Chad Townsend	16	1996–97	Eastern Ill.
4	Chad Townsend	15	1996–97	Campbellsville
5	Ja Morant	14	2018–19	Eastern Ky
	Ja Morant	14	2018–19	SE Missouri
	Ja Morant	14	2018–19	Jackson St.
	Ja Morant	14	2017–18	Eastern Ill.
	Marcus Brown	14	1993–94	Pikeville
10	JaCobi Wood	13	2018–19	Maryland Eastern Shore
	Ja Morant	13	2018–19	Austin Peay
	Ja Morant	13	2018–19	Morehead St.
	Ja Morant	13	2018–19	Bethel
	Ja Morant	13	2018–19	Southern Ill.
	Don Mann	13	1988–89	Lamar

== Steals ==
Career
Rk	Player	Steals	Seasons
1	Marcus Brown	232	1992–93 1993–94 1994–95 1995–96
2	Vincent Rainey	176	1993–94 1994–95 1995–96 1996–97
3	Danero Thomas	172	2006–07 2007–08 2008–09 2009–10
4	Cuthbert Victor	167	2000–01 2001–02 2002–03 2003–04
5	Cedric Gumm	160	1990–91 1991–92 1992–93 1993–94
6	Popeye Jones	159	1988–89 1989–90 1990–91 1991–92
7	Isaiah Canaan	157	2009–10 2010–11 2011–12 2012–13
	Tevin Brown	157	2018–19 2019–20 2020–21 2021–22
9	Shawn Witherspoon	146	2003–04 2004–05 2005–06 2006–07
10	Aubrey Reese	133	1997–98 1998–99 1999–00
	Frank Allen	133	1989–90 1990–91 1991–92 1992–93

Season
Rk	Player	Steals	Season
1	Marcus Brown	76	1994–95
2	Cameron Payne	68	2014–15
3	Marcus Brown	65	1995–96
	Fred Walker	65	1994–95
5	B.J. Jenkins	64	2009–10
6	Donte Poole	63	2011–12
7	Aubrey Reese	62	1999–00
8	Shaq Buchanan	60	2018–19
	Danero Thomas	60	2009–10
10	Zedric Macklin	59	1985–86
	Vincent Rainey	59	1995–96
	Chuck Glass	59	1985–86

Single game
Rk	Player	Steals	Season	Opponent
1	Kevin Thomas	8	2008–09	Missouri
	Brian Stewart	8	1982–83	Eastern Ill.
3	Shaq Buchanan	7	2018–19	Middle Tenn.
	Isaiah Canaan	7	2012–13	SIUE
5	Shaq Buchanan	6	2018–19	Eastern Ky.
	Cameron Payne	6	2014–15	Brescia
	Cameron Payne	6	2014–15	Eastern Ky.
	Danero Thomas	6	2009–10	UT Martin
	Trey Pearson	6	2005–06	Eastern Ill.
	Trey Pearson	6	2004–05	Missouri
	Chris Shumate	6	2003–04	Eastern Ky.
	Adam Chiles	6	2003–04	SIUE
	Cuthbert Victor	6	2002–03	Eastern Ky.
	Aubrey Reese	6	1999–00	Eastern Ky.

== Blocks ==
Career
Rk	Player	Blocks	Seasons
1	Cuthbert Victor	160	2000–01 2001–02 2002–03 2003–04
2	Tony Easley	158	2006–07 2007–08 2008–09 2009–10
3	Ed Daniel	156	2009–10 2010–11 2011–12 2012–13
4	Popeye Jones	136	1988–89 1989–90 1990–91 1991–92
5	Antoine Teague	124	1992–93 1993–94
6	Isaac Spencer	123	1997–98 1998–99 1999–00 2000–01
7	Andi Hornig	119	2000–01 2001–02 2002–03 2003–04
8	James Singleton	115	2001–02 2002–03
9	Pearson Griffith	113	2004–05 2005–06
10	Quennon Echols	102	1994–95 1995–96

Season
Rk	Player	Blocks	Season
1	Tony Easley	95	2009–10
2	Pearson Griffith	79	2005–06
3	Popeye Jones	71	1989–90
4	Fred King	67	2025–26
5	Quennon Echols	65	1994–95
6	Antoine Teague	64	1993–94
7	James Singleton	63	2001–02
8	Jarvis Williams	60	2013–14
	Antoine Teague	60	1992–93
10	Cuthbert Victor	57	2003–04

Single game
Rk	Player	Blocks	Season	Opponent
1	Pearson Griffith	8	2005–06	UT Martin
2	Tony Easley	7	2009–10	SE Missouri
	Tony Easley	7	2009–10	UT Martin
	Pearson Griffith	7	2005–06	San Antonio
	Cuthbert Victor	7	2001–02	UT Martin
6	Jarvis Williams	6	2014–15	SIUE
	Cameron Payne	6	2014–15	Brescia
	Ed Daniel	6	2012–13	Tenn. State
	Cuthbert Victor	6	2003–04	Texas A&M-CC
	Cuthbert Victor	6	2003–04	Eastern Ky.
	Cuthbert Victor	6	2002–03	Eastern Ky.
	James Singleton	6	2001–02	Eastern Ky.
	James Singleton	6	2001–02	UAB
