= 1991 Ohio Valley Conference men's basketball tournament =

- Classification: Division I
- Season: 1990–91
- Teams: 7
- Site: Racer Arena; Murray, Kentucky
- Champions: Murray State (5th title)
- Winning coach: Steve Newton (3rd title)
- MVP: Popeye Jones (2nd MVP) (Murray State)

1990–91 Ohio Valley Conference men's basketball standings
	Conf.				Overall
Team	W		L	PCT	W		L	PCT
Murray State †	10	–	2	.833	24	–	9	.727
Eastern Kentucky	9	–	3	.750	19	–	10	.655
Tennessee Tech	6	–	6	.500	12	–	16	.429
Austin Peay	6	–	6	.500	15	–	14	.517
Middle Tennessee	6	–	6	.500	21	–	9	.700
Morehead State	4	–	8	.333	16	–	13	.552
Tennessee State	1	–	11	.083	5	–	23	.179
† 1991 OVC tournament winner

The 1991 Ohio Valley Conference men's basketball tournament was the final event of the 1990–91 season in the Ohio Valley Conference. The tournament was held March 2-4, 1991, at Racer Arena in Murray, Kentucky.

Murray State defeated Middle Tennessee in the championship game, 79–67, to win their fifth OVC men's basketball tournament.

The Racers received an automatic bid to the 1991 NCAA tournament as the #13 seed in the Southeast region.

== Format ==
All seven of the conference's members participated in the tournament field. They were seeded based on regular season conference records, with the top seed (Murray State) receiving a bye to the semifinal round. The teams were re-seeded after the opening round.

== Bracket ==
Quarterfinals; Tuesday, March 3
4	Middle Tennessee	87
5	Austin Peay	83
(Pairings are reseeded after the first round)
3	Tennessee Tech	83
6	Morehead State	88
2	Eastern Kentucky	91
7	Tennessee State	70

Semifinals; Wednesday, March 4
1	Murray State	89
6	Morehead State	61
4	Middle Tennessee	83
2	Eastern Kentucky	66

Championship; Thursday, March 5
1	Murray State	79
4	Middle Tennessee	67
