= 1990 Ohio Valley Conference men's basketball tournament =

- Classification: Division I
- Season: 1989–90
- Teams: 7
- Site: Racer Arena; Murray, Kentucky
- Champions: Murray State (4th title)
- Winning coach: Steve Newton (2nd title)
- MVP: Popeye Jones (Murray State)

1989–90 Ohio Valley Conference men's basketball standings
	Conf.				Overall
Team	W		L	PCT	W		L	PCT
Murray State †	10	–	2	.833	21	–	9	.700
Tennessee Tech	9	–	3	.750	19	–	9	.679
Morehead State	7	–	5	.583	16	–	13	.552
Eastern Kentucky	7	–	5	.583	13	–	17	.433
Middle Tennessee	5	–	7	.417	12	–	15	.444
Tennessee State	2	–	10	.167	7	–	20	.259
Austin Peay	2	–	10	.167	10	–	19	.345
† 1990 OVC tournament winner Rankings from AP Poll

The 1990 Ohio Valley Conference men's basketball tournament was the final event of the 1989–90 season in the Ohio Valley Conference. The tournament was held March 3–5, 1990, at Racer Arena in Murray, Kentucky.

Murray State defeated Eastern Kentucky in the championship game, 63–57, to win their fifth OVC men's basketball tournament.

The Racers received an automatic bid to the 1990 NCAA tournament as the #16 seed in the Southeast region. They took #1 seed Michigan State to overtime before falling, 75–71.

== Format ==
All seven of the conference's members participated in the tournament field. They were seeded based on regular season conference records, with the top seed (Murray State) receiving a bye to the semifinal round. The teams were re-seeded after the opening round.

== Bracket ==
Quarterfinals; Tuesday, March 3
4	Eastern Kentucky	65
5	Middle Tennessee	52
(Pairings are reseeded after the first round)
3	Morehead State	92
6	Tennessee State	89
2	Tennessee Tech	57
7	Austin Peay	75

Semifinals; Wednesday, March 4
1	Murray State	68
7	Austin Peay	67
4	Eastern Kentucky	52
3	Morehead State	50

Championship; Thursday, March 5
1	Murray State	73
4	Eastern Kentucky	67
