= Steve Newton =

American basketball coach (born 1941)

Biographical details
- Born: April 23, 1941 (age 85); Terre Haute, Indiana, U.S.

Playing career
- 1960–1963: Indiana State

Coaching career (HC unless noted)
- 1963–1965: Reelsville HS (IN)
- 1965–1969: Plainfield HS (IN)
- 1969–1973: New Orleans (asst.)
- 1973–1978: Mississippi State (asst.)
- 1978–1985: Murray State (asst.)
- 1985–1991: Murray State
- 1991–1993: South Carolina

Head coaching record
- Overall: 136–100 (.576) (college)
- Tournaments: 1–3 (NCAA Division I); 0–1 (NIT)

Accomplishments and honors

Championships
- 3 OVC tournament (1988, 1990, 1991); 4 OVC regular season (1988–1991)

Awards
- 2× OVC Coach of the Year (1988, 1990)

Steve Newton (born April 23, 1941) is an American basketball coach. He was men's head coach at Murray State University from 1985 to 1991 and at University of South Carolina from 1991 to 1993. A native of Terre Haute, Indiana, he was a player at Indiana State University from 1960 to 1963; he scored 890 points over three varsity seasons and helped lead the Sycamores to berths in the 1962 and 1963 NAIA Tournaments. A graduate of Terre Haute's Gerstmeyer Tech, he played high school basketball for the legendary Howard Sharpe, the winningest coach in Indiana high school basketball.

== Coaching career ==
=== Assistant coaching ===
After serving as head coach at two Indiana high schools, Reelsville H.S. 1963-65 and Plainfield H.S.1965-69, Newton served as an assistant coach under Ron Greene at the University of New Orleans from 1969 to 1973. In 1971, he helped lead the Privateers to a No. 1 ranking in the final Division II poll (21–1), as the team finished fourth in the NCAA Division II Regionals. The following season, he helped lead New Orleans to third place in the NCAA Division II Regionals.

On May 1, 1973, Newton was hired by athletic director Charles N. Shira to the Mississippi State University basketball coaching staff. Under Head Coach Kermit Davis, Newton was in charge of recruiting, scouting and defensive play responsibilities. On May 11, 1978, following Davis' resignation, Greene was named head coach at Mississippi State by director of athletics Bob Tyler. Greene joined assistants Newton and Mike Dill, who were already on the basketball staff.

In 1978, Newton was hired by athletic director Johnny Reagan at Murray State University as associate coach to newly hired Greene. Newton served as associate coach under Greene from 1978 to 1985.

=== Head coach at Murray State ===
Newton was named head basketball coach at Murray State University in 1985 by President Kala Stroup, the board of trustees and Athletics Director Johnny Reagan. In six seasons as the Racers head coach, Newton had an overall record of 116-65 (64%), an Ohio Valley Conference mark of 57–21, including a 43-7 (86%) in his last four seasons, and won four OVC regular season and three OVC Tournament titles. Newton became only the second coach in OVC history to lead his team to four consecutive league titles (1987–88, 1988–89, 1989–90, and 1990–91). Only Western Kentucky's E.A. Diddle had ever won or shared four straight OVC championships, from 1953 to 1957. The Racers during Newton's tenure earned three NCAA tournament appearances and one NIT appearance. The high point of his career at Murray State came on March 18, 1988, when the Racers defeated North Carolina State 78–75 in the first round of the 1988 NCAA Division I men's basketball tournament. It was Murray State's first NCAA Tournament victory. Murray State would lose to eventual national champion Kansas by three points in the second round; that game was KU's closest en route to the championship.

At the 1988 NCAA Basketball Coaches Convention, Newton was awarded the 1987-88 Kodak Basketball District 7 Coach of the Year in Division 1. He was named OVC Coach of the Year twice (1988, 1990) and recruited and coached 15 All-OVC and four OVC Player of the Year selections, including Racer great Popeye Jones.

Newton was inducted into the Ohio Valley Conference Hall of Fame in Nashville, Tennessee, on June 1, 2007.

On February 6, 2010, Newton was inducted into the Murray State Athletics Hall of Fame in Murray, Kentucky.

=== Head coach and assistant AD at South Carolina ===
Newton was named the South Carolina Gamecocks head basketball coach on July 11, 1991. He coached the inaugural Southeastern Conference game for the Gamecocks on January 4, 1992, against the University of Kentucky.

Highlights of the 1991–92 season included the Texaco Star Classic in San Diego, California, where the Gamecocks downed George Washington and host San Diego State in double overtime to win the title. Leading scorer and rebounder Joe Rhett earned MVP honors. The school had its first-ever SEC wins in back-to-back outings over Tennessee and Georgia at home. The latter came in a thrilling, 71–69 game before an overflow crowd of 12,555. The home regular-season play finished with an impressive 77–68 victory over Vanderbilt on senior day.

The 1992–93 season began with a 95–85 win at Tennessee and after seven games in the SEC had a winning 4-3 ledger. Included in that span were home wins over Ole Miss and Georgia and another road victory at Florida.

Newton recruited forward Emmett Hall, who went on to play in the CBA, and coached swingman Jamie Watson, who played for the Utah Jazz, and Jo Jo English, who played in the CBA and two seasons with the Chicago Bulls in the NBA Newton had an overall record of 20-35 during his tenure at South Carolina.

Newton resigned after two seasons as head coach of the Gamecocks and was named assistant athletics director at South Carolina at the end of the 1993 season by Athletics Director Mike McGee.

== Administrative work ==
After two years as the assistant athletics director at South Carolina, he became Athletics Director at University of Southern Indiana on April 13, 1995. He retired in 2001 and his Assistant A.D., John Mark Hall, was hired as his successor.

== Head coaching record ==
Record table
Season	Team	Overall	Conference	Standing	Postseason
Murray State Racers (Ohio Valley Conference) (1985–1991)
1985–86	Murray State	17–12	8–6	T–3rd	
1986–87	Murray State	13–15	6–8	6th	
1987–88	Murray State	22–9	13–1	1st	NCAA Division I Second Round
1988–89	Murray State	19–11	10–2	T–1st	NIT First Round
1989–90	Murray State	21–9	10–2	1st	NCAA Division I First Round
1990–91	Murray State	24–9	10–2	1st	NCAA Division I First Round
Murray State:		116–65 (.641)	57–21 (.731)		
South Carolina Gamecocks (Southeastern Conference) (1991–1993)
1991–92	South Carolina	11–17	3–13	6th (East)	
1992–93	South Carolina	9–18	5–11	5th (East)	
South Carolina:		20–35 (.364)	8–24 (.250)		
Total:		136–100 (.576)			
National champion Postseason invitational champion Conference regular season champion Conference regular season and conference tournament champion Division regular season champion Division regular season and conference tournament champion Conference tournament champion
