= Otis Howard =

American basketball player (born 1956)

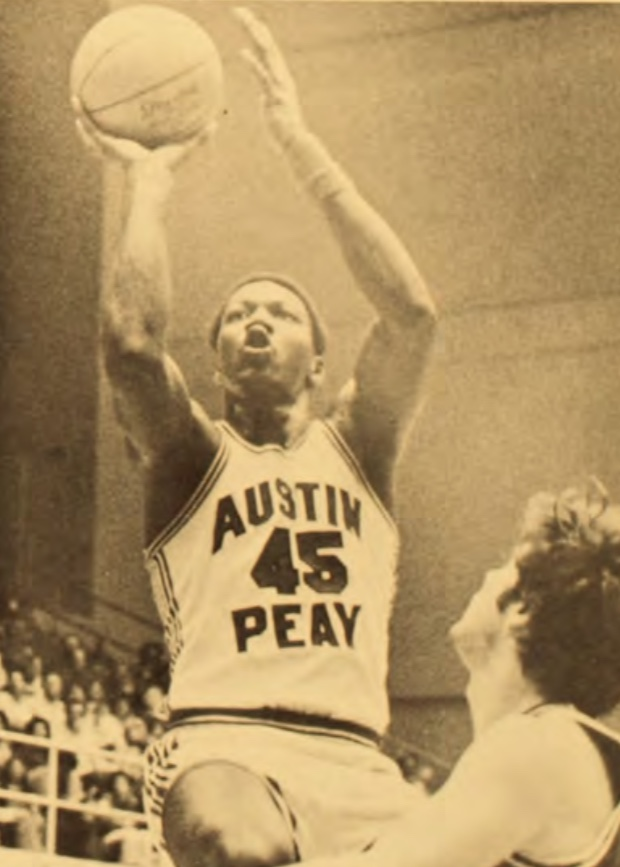
- Howard as a senior at APSU

Personal information
- Born: November 5, 1956 (age 70) Oak Ridge, Tennessee, U.S.
- Listed height: 6 ft 7 in (2.01 m)
- Listed weight: 220 lb (100 kg)

Career information
- High school: Oak Ridge (Oak Ridge, Tennessee)
- College: Austin Peay (1974–1978)
- NBA draft: 1978: 4th round, 80th overall pick
- Drafted by: Milwaukee Bucks
- Playing career: 1978–1990
- Position: Power forward
- Number: 30, 32

Career history
- 1978: Milwaukee Bucks
- 1978: Detroit Pistons
- 1978–1980: Sarila Rimini
- 1980–1984: Bartolini Brindisi
- 1984–1985: FC Barcelona
- 1985–1987: OAR Ferrol
- 1987–1988: S. Benedetto Torino
- 1988–1989: Sharp Montecatini
- 1989–1990: Tenerife AB

Career highlights
- Intercontinental Cup Champion (1985); Saporta Cup Champion (1985); 2× OVC Player of the Year (1977, 1978); No. 45 retired by Austin Peay Governors
- Stats at NBA.com
- Stats at Basketball Reference

Willie Otis Howard (born November 5, 1956) is an American former basketball player who played in the National Basketball Association (NBA). Howard was drafted by the Milwaukee Bucks in the fourth round of the 1978 NBA draft and began that season as a member of the team. He was later traded to the Detroit Pistons for a fourth-round draft pick.

A two-time Ohio Valley Conference Basketball Player of the Year, Howard is an inductee in the Austin Peay Athletics Hall of Fame.

== Career statistics ==
Legend
GP	Games played	GS	Games started	MPG	Minutes per game
FG%	Field goal percentage	3P%	3-point field goal percentage	FT%	Free throw percentage
RPG	Rebounds per game	APG	Assists per game	SPG	Steals per game
BPG	Blocks per game	PPG	Points per game	**Bold**	Career high

=== NBA ===
==== Regular season ====
Year	Team	GP	MPG	FG%	FT%	RPG	APG	SPG	BPG	PPG
1978–79	Milwaukee	3	7.3	**.455**	–	2.3	.3	.0	.0	3.3
1978–79	Detroit	**11**	**8.3**	.422	**.478**	**3.1**	**.4**	**.2**	**.2**	**4.5**
Career		14	8.1	.429	.478	2.9	.4	.1	.1	4.2
