= 1988 Ohio Valley Conference men's basketball tournament =

- Classification: Division I
- Season: 1987–88
- Teams: 7
- Site: Racer Arena; Murray, Kentucky
- Champions: Murray State (3rd title)
- Winning coach: Steve Newton (1st title)
- MVP: Jeff Martin (Murray State)

1987–88 Ohio Valley Conference men's basketball standings
	Conf.				Overall
Team	W		L	PCT	W		L	PCT
Murray State †	13	–	1	.929	22	–	9	.710
Middle Tennessee	11	–	3	.786	23	–	11	.676
Austin Peay	10	–	4	.714	17	–	13	.567
Eastern Kentucky	10	–	4	.714	18	–	11	.621
Tennessee Tech	5	–	9	.357	12	–	16	.429
Tennessee State	4	–	10	.286	11	–	17	.393
Youngstown State	2	–	12	.143	7	–	21	.250
Morehead State	1	–	13	.071	5	–	22	.185
† 1988 Ohio Valley Tournament winner Rankings from AP Poll

The 1988 Ohio Valley Conference men's basketball tournament was the final event of the 1987–88 season in the Ohio Valley Conference. The tournament was held March 7–9, 1988, at Racer Arena in Murray, Kentucky.

Murray State defeated Austin Peay in the championship game, 73–70, to win their third OVC men's basketball tournament.

The Racers received an automatic bid to the 1988 NCAA tournament as the No. 14 seed in the Midwest region.

== Bracket ==
Quarterfinals; Tuesday, March 7
4	Eastern Kentucky	85
5	Tennessee Tech	71
3	Austin Peay	81
6	Tennessee State	78
2	Middle Tennessee	81
7	Youngstown State	76

Semifinals; Wednesday, March 8
1	Murray State	76
4	Eastern Kentucky	60
3	Austin Peay	94
2	Middle Tennessee	82

Championship; Thursday, March 9
1	Murray State	73
3	Austin Peay	70
