= 1999 Ohio Valley Conference men's basketball tournament =

- Classification: Division I
- Season: 1998–99
- Teams: 8
- First round site: Campus Sites
- Semifinals site: Gaylord Entertainment Center; Nashville, Tennessee
- Finals site: Gaylord Entertainment Center; Nashville, Tennessee
- Champions: Murray State (10th title)
- Winning coach: Tevester Anderson (1st title)
- MVP: Aubrey Reese (Murray State)

1998–99 Ohio Valley Conference men's basketball standings
	Conf.				Overall
Team	W		L	PCT	W		L	PCT
Murray State †	16	–	2	.889	27	–	6	.818
Southeast Missouri State	15	–	3	.833	20	–	9	.690
Middle Tennessee	9	–	9	.500	12	–	19	.387
Austin Peay	9	–	9	.500	11	–	16	.407
Morehead State	9	–	9	.500	13	–	15	.464
Tennessee State	9	–	9	.500	12	–	15	.444
Eastern Illinois	8	–	10	.444	13	–	16	.448
Tennessee Tech	8	–	10	.444	12	–	15	.444
UT Martin	5	–	13	.278	8	–	18	.308
Eastern Kentucky	2	–	16	.111	3	–	23	.115
† 1999 OVC tournament winner Rankings from AP Poll

The 1999 Ohio Valley Conference men's basketball tournament was the postseason men's basketball tournament of the Ohio Valley Conference during the 1998–99 NCAA Division I men's basketball season. It was held February 23–28, 1999. The first round was hosted by the higher seeded team in each game. The semifinals and finals took place at Gaylord Entertainment Center in Nashville, Tennessee.

Top-seeded Murray State won the tournament, defeating Southeast Missouri State in the championship game, and received the Ohio Valley's automatic bid to the NCAA tournament. Aubrey Reese of Murray State was named the tournament's most valuable player.

== Format ==
The top eight eligible men's basketball teams in the Ohio Valley Conference receive a berth in the conference tournament. After the regular season, teams were seeded by conference record.

== Bracket ==
Quarterfinals; February 23
1	Murray State	96
8	Tennessee Tech	61
4	Austin Peay	77
5	Morehead State	82
3	Middle Tennessee	75
6	Tennessee State	68
2	Southeast Missouri State	78
7	Eastern Illinois	57

Semifinals; February 27
1	Murray State	92
5	Morehead State	69
3	Middle Tennessee	74
2	Southeast Missouri State	82

Finals; February 28
1	Murray State	62
2	Southeast Missouri State	61
