= 1998–99 Murray State Racers men's basketball team =

American college basketball season

1998–99 Murray State Racers men's basketball

Ohio Valley Regular season champions Ohio Valley tournament champions

NCAA tournament, first round
- Conference: Ohio Valley Conference
- Record: 27–6 (16–2 OVC)
- Head coach: Tevester Anderson (1st season)
- Home arena: Regional Special Events Center

1998–99 Ohio Valley Conference men's basketball standings
	Conf.				Overall
Team	W		L	PCT	W		L	PCT
Murray State †	16	–	2	.889	27	–	6	.818
Southeast Missouri State	15	–	3	.833	20	–	9	.690
Middle Tennessee	9	–	9	.500	12	–	19	.387
Austin Peay	9	–	9	.500	11	–	16	.407
Morehead State	9	–	9	.500	13	–	15	.464
Tennessee State	9	–	9	.500	12	–	15	.444
Eastern Illinois	8	–	10	.444	13	–	16	.448
Tennessee Tech	8	–	10	.444	12	–	15	.444
UT Martin	5	–	13	.278	8	–	18	.308
Eastern Kentucky	2	–	16	.111	3	–	23	.115
† 1999 OVC tournament winner Rankings from AP Poll

The 1998–99 Murray State Racers men's basketball team represented Murray State University during the 1998–99 NCAA Division I men's basketball season. The Racers, led by first-year head coach Tevester Anderson, played their home games at the brand new Regional Special Events Center in Murray, Kentucky, as members of the Ohio Valley Conference. They finished the season 27–6, 16–2 in OVC play to win the OVC regular season title. They defeated Southeast Missouri State to win the OVC tournament to advance to the NCAA tournament. As No. 13 seed in the South region, the Racers were beaten by No. 4 seed and eventual Final Four participant Ohio State, 72–58, in the opening round

== Roster ==
1998–99 Murray State Racers men's basketball team
Players
Coaches

Pos.	#	Name	Height	Weight	Year	Hometown
G	12	Aubrey Reese	6 ft 0 in (1.83 m)	185 lb (84 kg)	Jr	Auburn, Alabama
F	31	Isaac Spencer	6 ft 6 in (1.98 m)	205 lb (93 kg)	So	Montgomery, Alabama
F		Rod Murray	6 ft 7 in (2.01 m)	—	Jr

Head coach

- Tevester Anderson

Assistant coach(es)

Legend

- (C) Team captain
- (S) Suspended
- (I) Ineligible
- (W) Walk-on
- Injured
- Current redshirt

== Schedule and results ==
Date time, TV	Rank^{#}	Opponent^{#}	Result	Record	Site (attendance) city, state
Regular season
Nov 14, 1998*		Southern Illinois	W 65–62	1–0	Regional Special Events Center; Murray, Kentucky
Nov 21, 1998*		at Belmont	W 76–69	2–0	Striplin Gymnasium; Nashville, Tennessee
Nov 27, 1998*		vs. Arkansas–Little Rock	W 91–66	3–0	Lloyd Noble Center; Norman, Oklahoma
Nov 28, 1998*		at Oklahoma	W 68–64	4–0	Lloyd Noble Center; Norman, Oklahoma
Feb 20, 1999		at Austin Peay	L 72–80	24–5 (16–2)	Dunn Center; Clarksville, Tennessee
Ohio Valley Conference tournament
Feb 23, 1999*		Tennessee Tech; Quarterfinals	W 96–61	25–5	Regional Special Events Center; Murray, Kentucky
Feb 27, 1999*		vs. Morehead State; Semifinals	W 92–69	26–5	Nashville Arena; Nashville, Tennessee
Feb 28, 1999*		vs. Southeast Missouri State; Championship game	W 62–61	27–5	Nashville Arena; Nashville, Tennessee
NCAA tournament
Mar 11, 1999*	(13 S)	vs. (4 S) No. 14 Ohio State; First round	L 58–72	27–6	RCA Dome; Indianapolis, Indiana
*Non-conference game. ^{#}Rankings from AP Poll. (#) Tournament seedings in parentheses. S=South. All times are in Central Time.
