= 1987–88 Murray State Racers men's basketball team =

American college basketball season

1987–88 Murray State Racers men's basketball

Ohio Valley Regular season champions Ohio Valley tournament champions

NCAA tournament, Second round
- Conference: Ohio Valley Conference
- Record: 22–9 (13–1 OVC)
- Head coach: Steve Newton (3rd season)
- Home arena: Racer Arena

1987–88 Ohio Valley Conference men's basketball standings
	Conf.				Overall
Team	W		L	PCT	W		L	PCT
Murray State †	13	–	1	.929	22	–	9	.710
Middle Tennessee	11	–	3	.786	23	–	11	.676
Austin Peay	10	–	4	.714	17	–	13	.567
Eastern Kentucky	10	–	4	.714	18	–	11	.621
Tennessee Tech	5	–	9	.357	12	–	16	.429
Tennessee State	4	–	10	.286	11	–	17	.393
Youngstown State	2	–	12	.143	7	–	21	.250
Morehead State	1	–	13	.071	5	–	22	.185
† 1988 Ohio Valley Tournament winner Rankings from AP Poll

The 1987–88 Murray State Racers men's basketball team represented Murray State University during the 1987–88 NCAA Division I men's basketball season. The Racers, led by head coach Steve Newton, played their home games at Racer Arena in Murray, Kentucky as members of the Ohio Valley Conference. They finished the season 22–9, 13–1 in OVC play to win the OVC regular season championship. They defeated Austin Peay to win the OVC tournament to advance to the NCAA tournament. As No. 14 seed in the Southeast region, the Racers defeated No. 3 seed NC State, 78–75, in the opening round before losing to eventual National champion Kansas, 61–58, in the round of 32.

== Roster ==
1987–88 Murray State Racers men's basketball team
Players
Coaches

Pos.	#	Name	Height	Weight	Year	Previous school	Hometown
G	15	Jeff Martin	6 ft 5 in (1.96 m)	190 lb (86 kg)	Jr	Cross County HS	Cherry Valley, Arkansas
G	23	Don Mann	5 ft 8 in (1.73 m)	—	Jr

Head coach

- Steve Newton (Indiana State)

Assistant coach(es)

Legend

- (C) Team captain
- (S) Suspended
- (I) Ineligible
- (W) Walk-on
- Injured
- Current redshirt

== Schedule and results ==
Date time, TV	Rank^{#}	Opponent^{#}	Result	Record	Site (attendance) city, state
Regular season
Nov 27, 1987*		William Penn	W 97–49	1–0	Racer Arena (3,500); Murray, Kentucky
Nov 30, 1987*		Southern Illinois	L 70–77	1–1	Racer Arena (3,570); Murray, Kentucky
Dec 2, 1987*		Christian Brothers	W 82–69	2–1	Racer Arena (1,550); Murray, Kentucky
Dec 5, 1987*		at Evansville	L 70–76	2–2	Roberts Stadium; Evansville, Indiana
Dec 7, 1987*		Western Illinois	W 74–58	3–2	Racer Arena; Murray, Kentucky
Dec 11, 1987*		vs. Utah State; The Longhorn Classic	L 57–74	3–3	Frank Erwin Center; Austin, Texas
Dec 12, 1987*		vs. Pan American; The Longhorn Classic	L 57–60	3–4	Frank Erwin Center; Austin, Texas
Dec 18, 1987*		vs. Eastern Washington; Bayou Classic	W 84–57	4–4	Cajundome; Lafayette, Louisiana
Dec 19, 1987*		at Southwestern Louisiana; Bayou Classic	L 62–64	4–5	Cajundome; Lafayette, Louisiana
Jan 2, 1988*		Bethel College	W 96–60	5–5	Racer Arena (1,250); Murray, Kentucky
Jan 5, 1988*		at Memphis State	L 70–76 ^{OT}	5–6	Mid-South Coliseum (11,200); Memphis, Tennessee
Jan 9, 1988		Tennessee State	W 99–84	6–6 (1–0)	Racer Arena; Murray, Kentucky
Jan 12, 1988*		Western Kentucky	L 49–50	6–7	Racer Arena; Murray, Kentucky
Jan 16, 1988		Eastern Kentucky	W 95–84	7–7 (2–0)	Racer Arena; Murray, Kentucky
Jan 18, 1988		Morehead State	W 85–74	8–7 (3–0)	Racer Arena; Murray, Kentucky
Jan 23, 1988		at Middle Tennessee	W 79–67	9–7 (4–0)	Murphy Center; Murfreesboro, Tennessee
Jan 25, 1988		at Tennessee Tech	W 67–64	10–7 (5–0)	Eblen Center; Cookeville, Tennessee
Jan 30, 1988		at Youngstown State	W 87–62	11–7 (6–0)	Beeghly Center; Youngstown, Ohio
Feb 6, 1988		Austin Peay	L 71–74	11–8 (6–1)	Racer Arena; Murray, Kentucky
Feb 8, 1988		at Austin Peay	W 83–70	12–8 (7–1)	Dunn Center; Clarksville, Tennessee
Feb 13, 1988		at Tennessee State	W 78–70	13–8 (8–1)	Gentry Complex; Nashville, Tennessee
Feb 15, 1988		Youngstown State	W 71–64	14–8 (9–1)	Racer Arena; Murray, Kentucky
Feb 20, 1988		at Morehead State	W 77–75	15–8 (10–1)	Ellis Johnson Arena; Morehead, Kentucky
Feb 22, 1988		at Eastern Kentucky	W 79–78	16–8 (11–1)	McBrayer Arena; Richmond, Kentucky
Feb 27, 1988		Tennessee Tech	W 80–75	17–8 (12–1)	Racer Arena; Murray, Kentucky
Feb 29, 1988		Middle Tennessee	W 82–66	18–8 (13–1)	Racer Arena; Murray, Kentucky
Mar 7, 1988*		at Western Illinois; Quarterfinals	W 78–68	19–8	Western Hall; Macomb, Illinois
Ohio Valley Conference tournament
Mar 8, 1988*	(1)	(4) Eastern Kentucky; Semifinals	W 76–60	20–8	Racer Arena; Murray, Kentucky
Mar 9, 1988*	(1)	(3) Austin Peay; Championship game	W 73–70	21–8	Racer Arena; Murray, Kentucky
NCAA tournament
Mar 18, 1988*	(14 MW)	vs. (3 MW) No. 14 NC State; First round	W 78–75	22–8	Bob Devaney Sports Center; Lincoln, Nebraska
Mar 20, 1988*	(14 MW)	vs. (6 MW) Kansas; Second round	L 58–61	22–9	Bob Devaney Sports Center; Lincoln, Nebraska
*Non-conference game. ^{#}Rankings from AP Poll. (#) Tournament seedings in parentheses. SE=Southeast. All times are in Central Time.

== Awards and honors ==
- Jeff Martin – OVC Player of the Year
- Steve Newton – OVC Coach of the Year
