= 2004 National Basketball Development League draft =

General information
- Sport: Basketball
- Date: November 4, 2004

Overview
- League: NBA
- First selection: Ricky Minard

The 2004 NBDL Draft was the fourth annual draft by the National Basketball Development League. It was held on November 4, 2004.

== Draft ==
=== Round 1 ===
1. Columbus: Ricky Minard
2. Roanoke: Cory Alexander
3. Fayetteville: Ruben Boumtje-Boumtje
4. Huntsville: Joe Shipp
5. Florida: Kirk Haston
6. Asheville: Kirk Penney

=== Round 2 ===
1. Columbus: Jason Lawson
2. Roanoke: James Thomas
3. Fayetteville: Jon Smith
4. Huntsville: Austin Nichols
5. Florida: DeAngelo Collins
6. Asheville: Ron Slay

=== Round 3 ===
1. Columbus: Seth Doliboa
2. Roanoke: Isiah Victor
3. Fayetteville: Romauld Augustin
4. Huntsville: Mengke Bateer
5. Florida: Marcus Moore
6. Asheville: Jonathan Oden

=== Round 4 ===
1. Columbus: Kitwana Rhymer
2. Roanoke: Sung-Yoon Bang
3. Fayetteville: Ousmane Cisse
4. Huntsville: Ed Scott
5. Florida: Kendall Dartez
6. Asheville: Timmy Bowers

=== Round 5 ===
1. Columbus: Scott Merritt
2. Roanoke: Josh Sankes
3. Fayetteville: Chris Brooks
4. Huntsville: Bernard King Jr.
5. Florida: Alvin Snow
6. Asheville: Tony Kitchings

=== Round 6 ===
1. Columbus: Lawrence Felder
2. Roanoke: Chris Alexander
3. Fayetteville: Greg Davis
4. Huntsville: Randy Orr
5. Florida: John Flippen
6. Asheville: Chris Jefferies

=== Round 7 ===
1. Columbus: James Moore
2. Roanoke: Sherman Gay
3. Fayetteville: Sean Finn
4. Huntsville: Brandon Hawkins
5. Florida: Chris Daniels
6. Asheville: Derrick Davenport

=== Round 8 ===
1. Columbus: Mike Benton
2. Roanoke: Miah Davis
3. Fayetteville: Antwan Jones
4. Huntsville: Charles Gaines
5. Florida: Byron Mouton
6. Asheville: Nate Burton

=== Round 9 ===
1. Columbus: Aubrey Reese
2. Roanoke: Mark Davis
3. Fayetteville: Brandon Bender
4. Huntsville: Darrell Tucker
5. Florida: Tim Washington
6. Asheville: Tony Dobbins

=== Round 10 ===
1. Columbus: Luke Minor
2. Roanoke: Terrence Hill
3. Fayetteville: Quannas White
4. Huntsville: Tarise Bryson
5. Florida: Kevin Braswell
6. Asheville: Jay Joseph
