= Jim Jennings (basketball) =

American basketball player

Personal information
- Born: April 14, 1941 Murfreesboro, Tennessee
- Died: September 1, 2014 (aged 73) Lexington, Kentucky
- Listed height: 6 ft 6 in (1.98 m)

Career information
- High school: Wilbur Wright (Dayton, Ohio)
- College: Murray State (1961–1964)
- NBA draft: 1964: undrafted
- Position: Center / power forward

Career highlights
- OVC Player of the Year (1964); 3× First-team All-OVC (1962–1964)

James Jennings (March 14, 1941 – September 1, 2014) was an American basketball player, best known for his college career at Murray State University where he was the 1964 Ohio Valley Conference Player of the Year and led the Racers to their first NCAA Tournament appearance.

Jennings was born in Murfreesboro, Tennessee, and at a young age his family moved to Dayton, Ohio. He starred at Dayton's Wilbur Wright High School where he was selected to play in the Ohio North/South All-Star game.

Freshmen were ineligible to play in Jennings's era, but he made the most of his three-year career. As a sophomore, Jennings averaged 20.5 points and 17.2 rebounds per game, leading the team in both categories. As a junior, he averaged 17.6 points and 16.1 rebounds and finished second in the OVC Player of the Year balloting to Morehead State's Harold Sergent. In his senior season, Jennings led the Racers to a 16–9 record and averaged 19.6 points and 15.1 rebounds. Murray State won both the regular-season and tournament conference championships and Jennings was named the conference Player of the Year. The Racers went to the program's first NCAA Tournament that year, losing to defending champion Loyola 101–91. Jennings led the team in scoring with 24 points in his last collegiate game.

For his three-year career, Jennings scored 1,370 points (19.3 per game) and collected 1,147 rebounds (16.2 per game). He led the Racers in both categories in each of his seasons. In 1978, Jennings was named to the Murray State Athletic Hall of Fame.

Following his playing days, Jennings had a long career as a musician. He died on September 1, 2014, in Lexington, Kentucky.
