= 1989–90 Murray State Racers men's basketball team =

American college basketball season

1989–90 Murray State Racers men's basketball

Ohio Valley Regular season champions Ohio Valley tournament champions

NCAA tournament
- Conference: Ohio Valley Conference
- Record: 21–9 (10–2 OVC)
- Head coach: Steve Newton (5th season)
- Home arena: Racer Arena

1989–90 Ohio Valley Conference men's basketball standings
	Conf.				Overall
Team	W		L	PCT	W		L	PCT
Murray State †	10	–	2	.833	21	–	9	.700
Tennessee Tech	9	–	3	.750	19	–	9	.679
Morehead State	7	–	5	.583	16	–	13	.552
Eastern Kentucky	7	–	5	.583	13	–	17	.433
Middle Tennessee	5	–	7	.417	12	–	15	.444
Tennessee State	2	–	10	.167	7	–	20	.259
Austin Peay	2	–	10	.167	10	–	19	.345
† 1990 OVC tournament winner Rankings from AP Poll

The 1989–90 Murray State Racers men's basketball team represented Murray State University during the 1989–90 NCAA Division I men's basketball season. The Racers, led by head coach Steve Newton, played their home games at Racer Arena in Murray, Kentucky as members of the Ohio Valley Conference. They finished the season 21–9, 10–2 in OVC play to win the OVC regular season championship. They defeated Eastern Kentucky to win the OVC tournament to advance to the NCAA tournament. As No. 16 seed in the Southeast region, the Racers took No. 1 seed Michigan State to overtime before losing 75–71.

== Roster ==
1989–90 Murray State Racers men's basketball team
Players	Coaches
Pos. / # / Name / Height / Weight / Year / Previous school / Hometown; F / 54 / Popeye Jones / 6 ft 8 in (2.03 m) / 250 lb (113 kg) / So / Dresden HS / Dresden, TN	Head coach: Steve Newton (Indiana State); Assistant coach(es) Legend: (C) Team captain; (S) Suspended; (I) Ineligible; (W) Walk-on; Injured; Current redshirt

== Schedule and results ==
Date time, TV	Rank^{#}	Opponent^{#}	Result	Record	Site (attendance) city, state
Regular season
Nov 29, 1989*		at Western Kentucky	W 66–64	1–0	E.A. Diddle Arena; Bowling Green, Kentucky
Dec 2, 1989*		at Saint Louis	L 68–78	1–1	Kiel Auditorium; St. Louis, Missouri
Dec 4, 1989*		at Eastern Illinois	L 50–55	1–2	Lantz Arena; Charleston, Illinois
Dec 9, 1989*		Southern Illinois	L 108–114 ^{3OT}	1–3	Racer Arena; Murray, Kentucky
Dec 11, 1989*		Georgia Southern	L 69–71	1–4	Racer Arena; Murray, Kentucky
Dec 16, 1989*		at Evansville	L 69–93	1–5	Roberts Stadium; Evansville, Indiana
Dec 18, 1989*		Southern California College	W 71–68	2–5	Racer Arena; Murray, Kentucky
Dec 29, 1989*		vs. Texas-San Antonio; Lamar Tournament	W 107–101 ^{OT}	3–5	Montagne Center; Beaumont, Texas
Dec 30, 1989*		at Lamar; Lamar Tournament	W 88–81	4–5	Montagne Center; Beaumont, Texas
Jan 3, 1990*		Saint Louis	L 60–76	4–6	Racer Arena; Murray, Kentucky
Jan 5, 1990*		vs. Alcorn State; McDonnell Classic	W 72–60	5–6	Clemente Center; Melbourne, Florida
Jan 6, 1990*		vs. Florida Tech; McDonnell Classic	W 72–62	6–6	Clemente Center; Melbourne, Florida
Jan 9, 1990*		Arkansas State	W 64–62	7–6	Racer Arena; Murray, Kentucky
Jan 13, 1990		Morehead State	W 71–55	8–6 (1–0)	Racer Arena; Murray, Kentucky
Jan 15, 1990		Eastern Kentucky	W 58–45	9–6 (2–0)	Racer Arena; Murray, Kentucky
Jan 20, 1990		at Middle Tennessee State	W 80–71	10–6 (3–0)	Murphy Center; Murfreesboro, Tennessee
Jan 22, 1990		at Tennessee Tech	W 81–75	11–6 (4–0)	Eblen Center; Cookeville, Tennessee
Jan 27, 1990*		at Nicholls State	W 75–56	12–6	Stopher Gymnasium; Thibodaux, Louisiana
Jan 29, 1990		at Tennessee State	W 80–67	13–6 (5–0)	Gentry Center; Nashville, Tennessee
Feb 3, 1990		at Austin Peay	W 58–55	14–6 (6–0)	Dunn Center; Clarksville, Tennessee
Feb 5, 1990		Austin Peay	W 66–58	15–6 (7–0)	Racer Arena; Murray, Kentucky
Feb 10, 1990		Tennessee State	W 90–89	16–6 (8–0)	Racer Arena; Murray, Kentucky
Feb 12, 1990*		at Georgia Southern	W 82–79	17–6	Hanner Fieldhouse; Statesboro, Georgia
Feb 17, 1990		Tennessee Tech	W 71–63	18–6 (9–0)	Racer Arena; Murray, Kentucky
Feb 19, 1990		Middle Tennessee State	L 76–81	18–7 (9–1)	Racer Arena; Murray, Kentucky
Feb 24, 1990		at Eastern Kentucky	W 74–69	19–7 (10–1)	McBrayer Arena; Richmond, Kentucky
Feb 26, 1990		at Morehead State	L 79–81	19–8 (10–2)	Ellis Johnson Arena; Morehead, Kentucky
Ohio Valley Conference tournament
Mar 4, 1990*	(1)	(7) Austin Peay; Semifinal	W 68–67	20–8	Racer Arena; Murray, Kentucky
Mar 5, 1990*	(1)	(4) Eastern Kentucky; Championship	W 63–57	21–8	Racer Arena; Murray, Kentucky
NCAA tournament
Mar 15, 1990*	(16 SE)	vs. (1 SE) No. 3 Michigan State; First Round	L 71–75 ^{OT}	21–9	Thompson-Boling Arena; Knoxville, Tennessee
*Non-conference game. ^{#}Rankings from AP Poll. (#) Tournament seedings in parentheses. SE=Southeast. All times are in Central Time.

== Awards and honors ==
- Popeye Jones – OVC Player of the Year
