= 1990–91 Murray State Racers men's basketball team =

American college basketball season

1990–91 Murray State Racers men's basketball

Puerto Rico Classic champions Ohio Valley Regular season champions Ohio Valley tournament champions

NCAA tournament, first round
- Conference: Ohio Valley Conference
- Record: 24–9 (10–2 OVC)
- Head coach: Steve Newton (6th season)
- Home arena: Racer Arena

1990–91 Ohio Valley Conference men's basketball standings
	Conf.				Overall
Team	W		L	PCT	W		L	PCT
Murray State †	10	–	2	.833	24	–	9	.727
Eastern Kentucky	9	–	3	.750	19	–	10	.655
Tennessee Tech	6	–	6	.500	12	–	16	.429
Austin Peay	6	–	6	.500	15	–	14	.517
Middle Tennessee	6	–	6	.500	21	–	9	.700
Morehead State	4	–	8	.333	16	–	13	.552
Tennessee State	1	–	11	.083	5	–	23	.179
† 1991 OVC tournament winner

The 1990–91 Murray State Racers men's basketball team represented Murray State University during the 1990–91 NCAA Division I men's basketball season. The Racers, led by head coach Steve Newton, played their home games at Racer Arena in Murray, Kentucky as members of the Ohio Valley Conference. They finished the season 24–9, 10–2 in OVC play to win the OVC regular season championship. They defeated Middle Tennessee to win the OVC tournament to advance to the NCAA tournament. As No. 14 seed in the Southeast region, the Racers battled No. 3 seed Alabama before losing 89–79.

== Roster ==
1990–91 Murray State Racers men's basketball team
Players	Coaches
Pos. / # / Name / Height / Weight / Year / Previous school / Hometown; F / 54 / Popeye Jones / 6 ft 8 in (2.03 m) / 250 lb (113 kg) / Jr / Dresden HS / Dresden, TN	Head coach: Steve Newton (Indiana State); Assistant coach(es) Legend: (C) Team captain; (S) Suspended; (I) Ineligible; (W) Walk-on; Injured; Current redshirt

== Schedule and results ==
Date time, TV	Rank^{#}	Opponent^{#}	Result	Record	Site (attendance) city, state
Regular season
Nov 23, 1990*		vs. Bucknell; Puerto Rico Classic	W 81–68	1–0	Mario Morales Coliseum; Guaynabo, Puerto Rico
Nov 24, 1990*		vs. Old Dominion; Puerto Rico Classic	W 76–61	2–0	Mario Morales Coliseum; Guaynabo, Puerto Rico
Nov 25, 1990*		vs. Nebraska; Puerto Rico Classic	W 81–79	3–0	Mario Morales Coliseum; Guaynabo, Puerto Rico
Nov 28, 1990*		Georgia Southern	W 78–61	4–0	Racer Arena; Murray, Kentucky
Dec 1, 1990*		Western Kentucky	W 97–91	5–0	Racer Arena; Murray, Kentucky
Dec 4, 1990*		at Memphis State	L 78–85	5–1	Mid-South Coliseum; Memphis, Tennessee
Dec 7, 1990*		vs. Texas Southern; Citizens Bank Classic	W 79–65	6–1	Convocation Center; Jonesboro, Arkansas
Dec 8, 1990*		at Arkansas State; Citizens Bank Classic	L 62–63	6–2	Convocation Center; Jonesboro, Arkansas
Dec 14, 1990*		at Southern Illinois	W 83–77	7–2	SIU Arena; Carbondale, Illinois
Dec 17, 1990*		Prairie View A&M	W 103–52	8–2	Racer Arena; Murray, Kentucky
Dec 21, 1990*		vs. U.S. International; U.S. Air Classic	W 103–55	9–2	Nutter Center; Fairborn, Ohio
Dec 22, 1990*		at Wright State; U.S. Air Classic	L 76–79	9–3	Nutter Center; Fairborn, Ohio
Dec 28, 1990*		vs. South Alabama; BMA Holiday Classic	W 88–78 ^{OT}	10–3	Kemper Arena; Kansas City, Missouri
Dec 29, 1990*		vs. Kansas State; BMA Holiday Classic	L 50–67	10–4	Kemper Arena; Kansas City, Missouri
Jan 2, 1991*		North Alabama	L 70–88	10–5	Racer Arena; Murray, Kentucky
Jan 5, 1991		Austin Peay	W 71–66	11–5 (1–0)	Racer Arena; Murray, Kentucky
Jan 8, 1991*		at Georgia Southern	L 63–66	11–6	Hanner Fieldhouse; Statesboro, Georgia
Jan 12, 1991*		IUPUI	W 84–52	12–6	Racer Arena; Murray, Kentucky
Jan 14, 1991		at Middle Tennessee State	W 70–66	13–6 (2–0)	Murphy Center; Murfreesboro, Tennessee
Jan 19, 1991		Tennessee State	L 73–75	13–7 (2–1)	Racer Arena; Murray, Kentucky
Jan 21, 1991		Tennessee Tech	W 86–74	14–7 (3–1)	Racer Arena; Murray, Kentucky
Jan 26, 1991		at Morehead State	W 80–55	15–7 (4–1)	Ellis Johnson Arena; Morehead, Kentucky
Jan 28, 1991		at Eastern Kentucky	L 82–87	15–8 (4–2)	McBrayer Arena; Richmond, Kentucky
Feb 2, 1991		at Austin Peay	W 79–71	16–8 (5–2)	Dunn Center; Clarksville, Tennessee
Feb 4, 1991*		at Prairie View A&M	W 81–68	17–8	William J. Nicks Building; Prairie View, Texas
Feb 9, 1991		Eastern Kentucky	W 64–52	18–8 (6–2)	Racer Arena; Murray, Kentucky
Feb 11, 1991		Morehead State	W 81–73	19–8 (7–2)	Racer Arena; Murray, Kentucky
Feb 16, 1991		at Tennessee Tech	W 72–64	20–8 (8–2)	Eblen Center; Cookeville, Tennessee
Feb 18, 1991		at Tennessee State	W 65–64	21–8 (9–2)	Gentry Complex; Nashville, Tennessee
Feb 23, 1991		Middle Tennessee State	W 91–86	22–8 (10–2)	Racer Arena; Murray, Kentucky
Ohio Valley Conference tournament
Mar 3, 1991*	(1)	(6) Morehead State; Semifinal	W 89–61	23–8	Racer Arena; Murray, Kentucky
Mar 4, 1991*	(1)	(4) Middle Tennessee State; Championship Game	W 79–67	24–8	Racer Arena; Murray, Kentucky
NCAA tournament
Mar 15, 1991*	(14 SE)	vs. (3 SE) No. 19 Alabama; First Round	L 79–89	24–9	The Omni; Atlanta, Georgia
*Non-conference game. ^{#}Rankings from AP Poll. (#) Tournament seedings in parentheses. SE=Southeast. All times are in Central Time.

== Awards and honors ==
- Popeye Jones – OVC Player of the Year
