= Aaron Nkrumah =

American basketball player (born 2001)

No. 30 – Stockton Kings
- Position: Shooting guard
- League: NBA G League

Personal information
- Born: November 26, 2001 (age 24) Worcester, Massachusetts, U.S.
- Listed height: 6 ft 6 in (1.98 m)
- Listed weight: 175 lb (79 kg)

Career information
- High school: South High Community (Worcester, Massachusetts); Marianapolis Preparatory School (Thompson, Connecticut)
- College: Worcester State (2023–2024); Tennessee State (2024–2026)
- NBA draft: 2026: undrafted
- Playing career: 2026–present

Career history
- 2026–present: Stockton Kings

Career highlights
- OVC Player of the Year (2026); First-team All-OVC (2026); MASCAC Player of the Year (2024); First-team All-MASCAC (2024)
- Stats at NBA.com
- Stats at Basketball Reference

Aaron Nkrumah (born November 26, 2001) is an American professional basketball player for the Stockton Kings of the NBA G League. He played college basketball for the Worcester State Lancers and for the Tennessee State Tigers.

== Early life ==
Nkrumah attended Marianapolis Preparatory School in Thompson, Connecticut, and committed to play college basketball at Quinsigamond Community College.

== College career ==
As a freshman during the 2020-21 season, Nkrumah did not play in any games as the team's season was canceled due to the COVID-19 pandemic. After the season, he entered the NCAA transfer portal. Nkrumah transferred to play for the Nichols Bison. However, he did not play any games for the Bison in the 2022-23 season, after which he entered the NCAA transfer portal.

Nkrumah transferred to play for the Worcester State Lancers. During the 2023-24 season, he averaged 16.9 points per game, earning NABC Division III All-Region First Team and MASCAC Player of the Year honors. After the conclusion of the season, Nkrumah again entered the NCAA transfer portal.

Nkrumah transferred to play for the Tennessee State Tigers. During the 2024-25 season, he averaged 10.9 points, 5.3 rebounds, and 3.0 assists per game. In 2025-26, Nkrumah averaged 17.7 points, 5.5 rebounds, 3.0 assists and 2.8 steals per game, earning Ohio Valley Conference Player of the Year honors. After the season, he declared for the 2026 NBA draft, accepting an invite to the NBA scouting combine.

== Professional career ==
Nkrumah went undrafted in the 2026 NBA draft, and signed an Exhibit 10 deal with the Denver Nuggets.
