= Marcel Boyce =

American basketball player

Personal information
- Born: May 14, 1965 (age 61) Lynchburg, Virginia, U.S.
- Listed height: 6 ft 6 in (1.98 m)
- Listed weight: 185 lb (84 kg)

Career information
- High school: E. C. Glass (Lynchburg, Virginia)
- College: Carl Albert State (1983–1985); Akron (1985–1987)
- NBA draft: 1987: 6th round, 122nd overall pick
- Drafted by: Phoenix Suns
- Position: Forward

Career history
- 1987–1988: Rapid City Thrillers

Career highlights
- OVC Player of the Year (1986); 2× First-team All-OVC (1986, 1987)
- Stats at Basketball Reference

Marcel E. Boyce Sr. (born May 14, 1965) is an American former professional basketball player. He played college basketball for the Akron Zips and was the Ohio Valley Conference Player of the Year in 1986.

== Playing career ==
Boyce played basketball and football while he attended E. C. Glass High School in Lynchburg, Virginia. He started his college basketball career at Carl Albert State College where he led Region II of the National Junior College Athletic Association (NJCAA) in rebounds with 12.7 a game during his freshman season. Boyce appeared in the 1985 Bi-State Junior College Men's All-Star Game and scored a game-high 22 points.

Boyce joined the Akron Zips under head coach Bob Huggins and immediately became the team's principal player. He led Zips in scoring with 17.5 points and averaged 8 rebounds per game during his first season. The Zips won the Ohio Valley Conference (OVC) title and played the Michigan Wolverines in the first round of the 1986 NCAA Division I basketball tournament. He was chosen as the OVC Player of the Year in 1986. Boyce was named to the All-OVC first team in 1987. He scored 1,108 points in 59 games played for the Zips.

Boyce was selected by the Phoenix Suns as the 122nd overall pick of the 1987 NBA draft. He was waived by the Suns on October 4, 1987. Boyce played professionally for the Rapid City Thrillers of the Continental Basketball Association (CBA) and overseas in Spain and Germany.

== Personal life ==
Boyce's son, Marcel Jr., played basketball and football at Buchtel Community Learning Center in Akron, Ohio, and committed to play for the Wayne State Warriors football team.
