= Aubrey Reese =

American basketball player (born 1978)

Personal information
- Born: October 13, 1978 (age 48) Auburn, Alabama, U.S.
- Listed height: 6 ft 0 in (1.83 m)
- Listed weight: 190 lb (86 kg)

Career information
- High school: Auburn (Auburn, Alabama)
- College: Murray State (1997–2000)
- NBA draft: 2000: undrafted
- Playing career: 2000–2013
- Position: Guard

Career history
- 2000: New Jersey Shore Cats
- 2000–2001: Idaho Stampede
- 2001: Oklahoma Storm
- 2001–2002: Shakhtar Irkutsk
- 2002–2003: Chorale Roanne
- 2003–2004: Tekelspor
- 2004–2005: Maccabi Haifa
- 2005–2006: Tekelspor
- 2006–2007: Beşiktaş
- 2007–2008: Azovmash
- 2008: Mersin BB
- 2008–2009: Aliağa Petkim
- 2009–2010: Deutsche Bank Skyliners
- 2010–2011: Mersin BB
- 2011–2012: Gloria Giants Düsseldorf
- 2012–2013: Göztepe S.K.

Career highlights
- LNB Pro A Best Scorer (2003); USBL Player of the Year (2001); OVC Player of the Year (2000); 2× First-team All-OVC (1999, 2000); OVC tournament MVP (1999)

Aubrey Lamar Reese (born October 13, 1978) is an American former professional basketball player. A 6-foot point guard, he played college basketball at Murray State for 3 years, being named the OVC Player of the Year in 2000. After going undrafted in the 2000 NBA draft he started his professional career in the USBL in 2000, and the following season he was named the USBL Player of the Year. He then moved to Europe, and in 2003 he was the top scorer of the LNB Pro A in France. He has played in several countries in Asia and Europe, including France, Germany, Israel, Russia and Turkey.

== High school career ==
Reese was born in Auburn, Alabama and attended Auburn High School, where in addition to basketball he also played football as a cornerback. In his senior year he was a 1st team 6A All-State selection by the Alabama Sports Writers Association.

== College career ==
Reese signed to play for Murray State but had to sit out his first season, as the NCAA ruled him academically ineligible. In 1997 he was reinstated and chose to wear jersey number 12, playing 33 games during the season, all coming off the bench, averaging 4.6 points, 1.8 rebounds and 2.1 assists in 11.8 minutes per game. Despite the limited playing time he was third in his team in assists per game.

After the graduation of senior guard De'Teri Mayes, Reese became a starter for the 1998–99 season. He played 33 games, starting all of them, and averaged 14.7 points, 5.0 rebounds, 4.9 assists and 1.8 steals in 35.6 minutes per game: he ranked first on his team in assists and steals, and second in rebounding and scoring. He obtained a new record for most assists in a home game at CFSB Center with 12 against Alabama State in 1999: the record has been surpassed by Ja Morant who recorded 14 against Eastern Illinois on December 28, 2017. During the 1999 OVC tournament Reese scored a buzzer beater against Southeast Missouri State, giving his team the OVC title, and was named the tournament MVP. His performance during the season earned him a selection in the All-OVC team. He also scored a career-high 26 points in a 72–58 loss to Ohio State on March 11, 1999, during the NCAA tournament.

Reese's senior season saw him start all of his 32 games, averaging a career-high 20.4 points, 5.3 rebounds, 4.8 assists and 1.9 steals in 37.6 minutes per game. He reached 1,000 career points on January 22, 2000, vs Morehead State, on his 84th game with the Racers, and during the season he recorded a career-high 29 points on two occasions, against Southeast Missouri State and Eastern Illinois. He led the OVC in total points (653) and points per game (20.4), and was 3rd in assists per game with 4.8: at the end of the season he was named in the All-OVC team and was the OVC Player of the Year.

He ended his career at Murray State with 1,291 total points.

=== College statistics ===
Year	Team	GP	GS	MPG	FG%	3P%	FT%	RPG	APG	SPG	BPG	PPG
1997–98	Murray State	33	0	11.8	.489	.375	.707	1.8	2.1	0.4	0.0	4.6
1998–99	Murray State	33	33	35.6	.439	.349	.735	5.0	4.9	1.8	0.0	14.7
1999–00	Murray State	32	32	37.6	.461	.353	.819	5.3	4.8	1.9	0.2	20.4
Career		98	65	28.4	.455	.352	.772	4.0	3.9	1.4	0.1	13.2

== Professional career ==
After the end of his senior season, Reese was automatically eligible for the 2000 NBA draft, but he was not selected by an NBA franchise. He was selected as the 70th overall pick in the USBL draft by the New Jersey Shore Cats, he was the 62nd pick in the CBA draft by the Idaho Stampede, and was also selected 27th overall by the Richmond Rhythm in the IBL draft. He signed for the New Jersey Shore Cats and played in the 2000 USBL season, averaging 12.8 points, 2.8 rebounds and 3 assists in 21.4 minutes per game. In November 2000 he moved to the CBA and played for the Idaho Stampede, averaging 6.5 points, 2.5 rebounds and 2.1 assists in 24 games played (1 start), playing 19 minutes per game. In 2001 he signed for the Oklahoma Storm of the USBL and in 22 games he averaged 26.2 points, 4 rebounds and 5.4 assists in 33.8 minutes per game, being named the 2001 USBL Player of the Year.

In the summer of 2001 he played in the Shaw's Pro Summer League with the Washington Wizards. He then joined Shakhtar Irkutsk of the Russian Super League A, and averaged 16.6 points, 3.4 rebounds and 4.2 assists in 24.9 minutes per game. In 2002 he moved to France and signed for Chorale Roanne Basket: in 34.8 minutes per game he averaged 19.9 points in 26 appearances, the best in the league, and won the LNB Pro A Best Scorer title. That year he shot 48% from the field (34.8% from three) and 76.5% from the free throw line.

In 2003 he joined Tekelspor of the Turkish Basketball League and played 16 games, averaging 19.3 points, 3.8 rebounds and 4.2 assists. During the 2004 NBDL draft he was selected as the 1st pick of the 9th round (49th overall) by the Columbus Riverdragons but he did not join the team and instead moved to Israel, where he played 15 games with Maccabi Haifa in the Ligat HaAl with averages of 18.9 points, 2.8 rebounds and 4.5 assists per game. After another season with Tekelspor (18.2 points and 4.8 assists per game) he signed for Beşiktaş, and debuted in an international competition: during the 2006–07 ULEB Cup he played 10 games averaging 18 points, 2.9 rebounds and 4.2 assists.

For the following season he left Turkey for Ukraine, signing for Azovmash: in the 2007–08 ULEB Cup he played 9 games averaging 2.6 points, 1.2 rebounds and 1.7 assists. He also appeared in 11 games in the Ukrainian Basketball SuperLeague averaging 5.3 points, 2 rebounds and 1.8 assists. He then moved back to Turkey and joined Mersin BB, ending the 2007–08 season there. In 2008–09 he played for Aliağa Petkim, appearing in 21 games and averaging 20.4 points, 4.4 rebounds and 5 assists in 36.2 minutes per game. In 2009 he joined Deutsche Bank Skyliners in Germany and played 27 games, recording averages of 14 points, 3.3 rebounds and 4.5 assists in the Basketball Bundesliga, where he also reached the finals, losing to Brose Baskets. He then spent the 2010–11 season in Turkey, again with Mersin, and in 2011 he moved to the Gloria Giants Düsseldorf in the 2. Basketball Bundesliga, the second level of German basketball, averaging 20.2 points, 4.1 rebounds and 4.3 assists in 34.8 minutes per game. He played his final professional season with Göztepe S.K. in the Turkish second level.
