= Harold Sergent =

American former basketball player

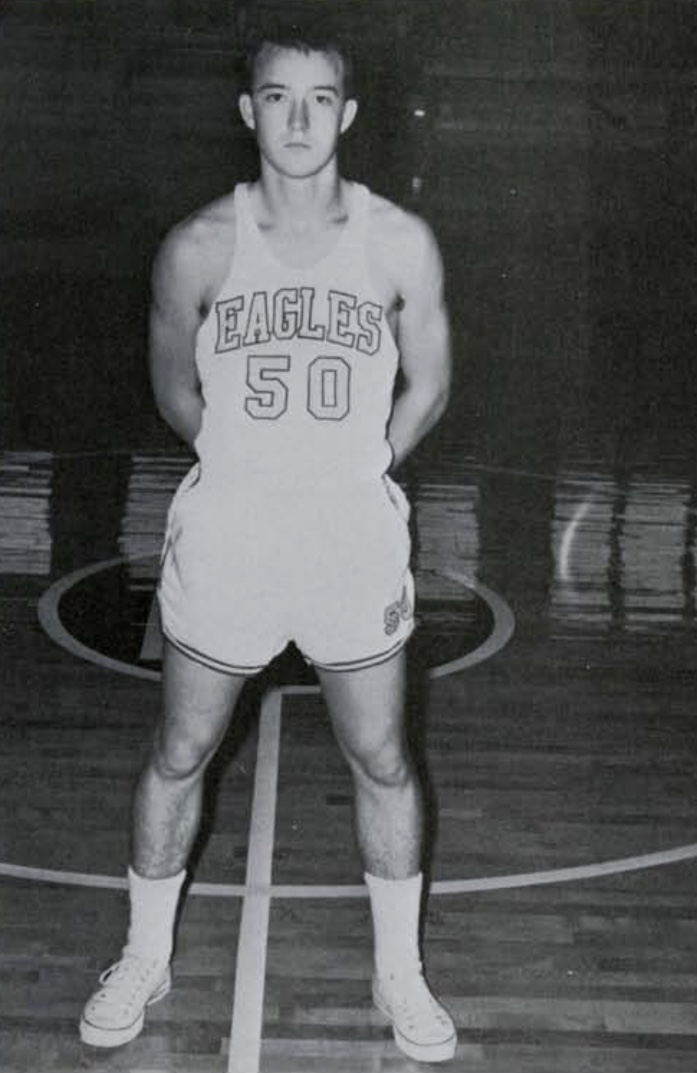
- Sergent during the 1962–63 season at Morehead State

Personal information
- Listed height: 6 ft 0 in (1.83 m)

Career information
- High school: Ashland (Ashland, Kentucky)
- College: Morehead State (1961–1965)
- NBA draft: 1965: undrafted
- Playing career: 1965–196?
- Position: Point guard

Career history
- Phillips 66ers

Career highlights
- 2× AAU All-American (1966, 1967); OVC Player of the Year (1963); 3× First-team All-OVC (1963–1965)

Harold E. Sergent is an American former basketball player who starred at Morehead State University before embarking on a career with the Phillips 66ers of the Amateur Athletic Union.

A point guard from Kentucky, Sergent led Ashland High School to a state championship as a senior in 1960–61. That season's state title run was later chronicled in a book entitled Teamwork: Ashland's 1961 Championship Basketball Season; it is considered one of the greatest high school teams in state history. Sergent then enrolled at Morehead State to play for the Eagles for four years. He became a star, and after averaging an Ohio Valley Conference (OVC) leading 20.4 points per game during his sophomore campaign, was named the OVC Player of the Year. Sergent was also honored with numerous all-conference and All-America honors throughout his collegiate career, and by the time he graduated in 1965 he had scored 1,469 points. His career 23.2 points per game average is second all-time at Morehead State.

After college, Sergent played for the Phillips 66 Oilers (commonly known as the Phillips 66ers) in the Amateur Athletic Union, which at the time was the premier amateur basketball league in the United States. Playing in the AAU allowed players to still compete in international competitions such as the Olympic Games because professional athletes were not allowed to participate. Sergent was twice named an AAU All-American, in 1966 and 1967.
