= Les Taylor (basketball) =

American basketball player

Personal information
- Listed height: 6 ft 3 in (1.91 m)

Career information
- High school: Carbondale (Carbondale, Illinois)
- College: Murray State (1970–1973)
- NBA draft: 1973: 9th round, 142nd overall pick
- Drafted by: Cleveland Cavaliers
- Position: Small forward

Career highlights
- 2× OVC Player of the Year (1972, 1973); 3× First-team All-OVC (1971–1973)
- Stats at Basketball Reference

Les Taylor is an American former basketball player best known for his collegiate career at Murray State University between 1970 and 1973. A native of Carbondale, Illinois, Taylor starred at Carbondale Community High School in basketball before enrolling at Murray State. He was named an All-American, and at the time of his decision to attend Murray State he was one of the most highly sought-after recruits the school had ever signed.

During Taylor's first season in 1969–70, NCAA rules prohibited freshmen from playing on their colleges' varsity sports teams, so Taylor played for Murray State's freshman squad and averaged 22.4 points per game. When he became eligible as a sophomore in 1970–71, the 6'3" small forward averaged 15.8 points and 8.8 rebounds per game en route to his first of three consecutive All-Ohio Valley Conference First Team honors. He was also named the conference's Sophomore of the Year. During Taylor's junior season, he averaged a still-standing school record 25.6 points per game (good for eighth in the nation) and twice scored 39 points in a single game. He was named the Evansville Holiday Tournament MVP, and at the end of the season was declared the Ohio Valley Conference Men's Basketball Player of the Year. In his final season, Taylor led the team in scoring and assists per game with averaged of 22.4 and 3.3, respectively. He earned his second consecutive conference player of the year honor as well.

The Cleveland Cavaliers selected him in the ninth round (142nd overall) in the 1973 NBA draft. In the 1973 ABA Draft, the Kentucky Colonels chose him in the seventh round. Despite getting drafted into two different basketball leagues, he played in neither. Taylor was inducted into the Murray State University Hall of Fame in 1987.
