= Isaac Spencer =

American basketball player (born 1977)

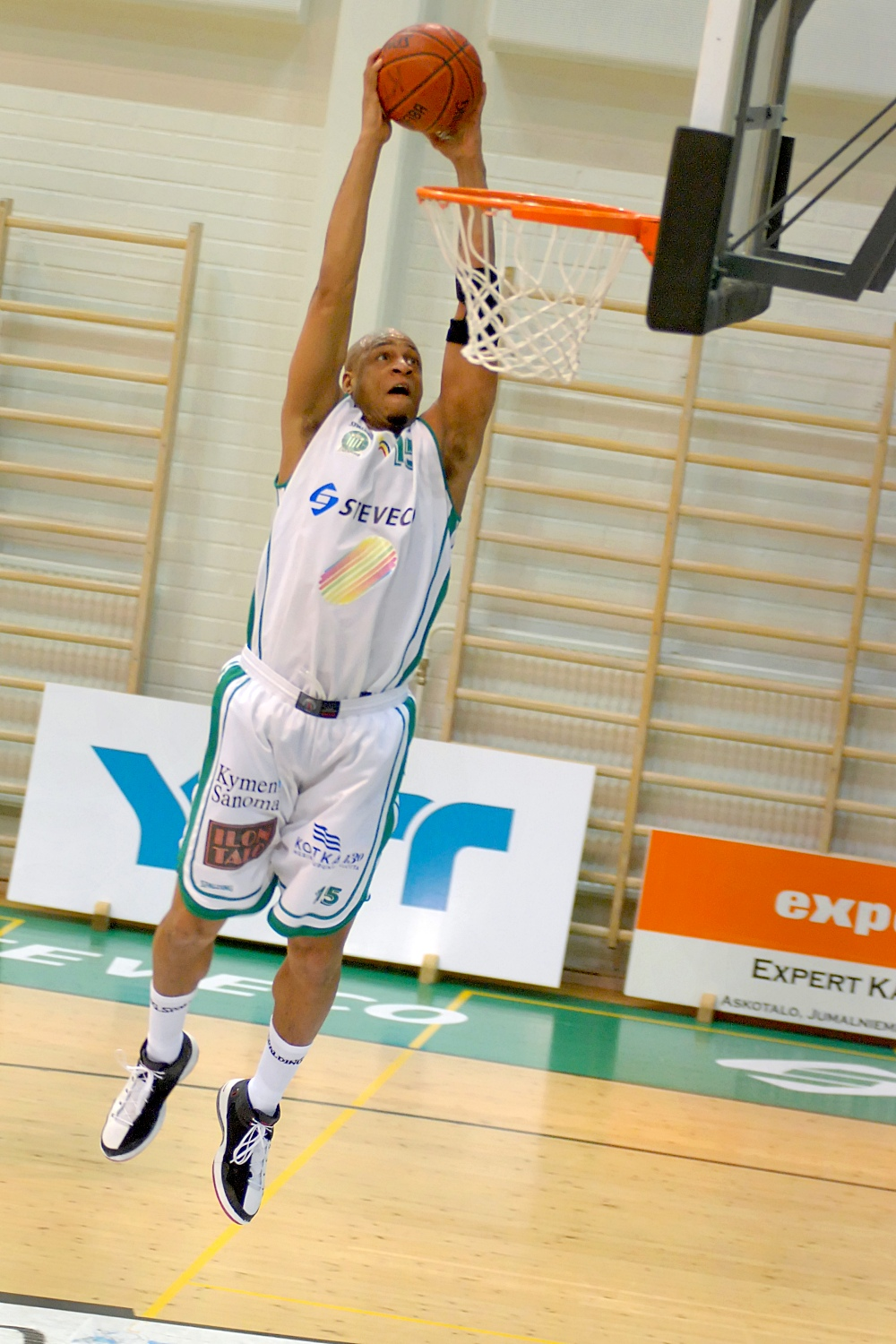

Personal information
- Born: December 8, 1977 (age 48)
- Listed height: 6 ft 6 in (1.98 m)
- Listed weight: 215 lb (98 kg)

Career information
- High school: Jefferson Davis (Montgomery, Alabama)
- College: Murray State (1997–2001)
- NBA draft: 2001: undrafted
- Playing career: 2001–2011
- Position: Forward

Career history
- 2001: Lakeland Blue Ducks
- 2001–2002: Kentucky Pro Cats
- 2002: St. Joseph Express
- 2002: Barangay Ginebra Kings
- 2003: Brevard Blue Ducks
- 2003–2004: Daegu Orions
- 2004: CPN Pueblo Nuevo
- 2008–2009: Torpan Pojat
- 2009–2010: KTP-Basket
- 2010–2011: Kouvot

Isaac Spencer (born December 8, 1977), is an American professional basketball player. At 6'6", he played as a forward.

== High school career ==
Spencer attended Jefferson Davis High School in Montgomery, Alabama where he excelled at basketball. Spencer was awarded the Alabama Mr. Basketball awarded in 1996 by the Alabama Sports Writers Association. The award is given annually to the best high school boys' basketball player in the state of Alabama. Spencer was also named First Team All-State and Alabama 6A Player of the Year in 1996.

== College career ==
Isaac Spencer played college basketball at Murray State University in Murray, Kentucky. He was named OVC Newcomer of the Year for the 1997–98 season. Spencer scored the first point of Murray State's inaugural basketball game in the CFSB Center in 1998. Spencer was the only returning senior for the 2000–01 season on the Murray State team. In March 2001, Spencer was named to the National Association of Basketball Coaches/Chevrolet Division I All-District 7 Second Team. During the 2000–01 season, Spencer led the Racers in both points and assists, a combination that wasn't matched again by a Racer until Isaiah Canaan in the 2011–12 season. Spencer averaged 17.7 PPG across his college career at Murray State, including 21.6 PPG during his senior season in 2000–01. Spencer remains number two among Murray State's all-time career scoring leaders and number six all-time in the Ohio Valley Conference with 2,248 points. Spencer was one of only two players in Murray State history to be named to the All-OVC team for four consecutive years. Spencer shares the four-time All-OVC honor with Lamont Sleets.

== Professional career ==
Isaac Spencer began his professional career in May 2001 with the Lakeland Blue Ducks of the United States Basketball League (USBL). In Fall 2001, Spencer was picked up by the Kentucky Pro Cats of the American Basketball Association; however, the Pro Cats disbanded in early 2002. Later that year, Spencer joined the St. Joseph Express of the USBL. Spencer had a high game of 32 points and 10 rebounds against the defending USBL champion Pennsylvania ValleyDawgs. In July 2002, Spencer joined the Barangay Ginebra Kings of the Philippine Basketball Association. Spencer returned to the United States for the 2003 USBL season. In that year he played in 30 games with the Brevard Blue Ducks of the USBL. Spencer played 34 games with the Daegu Orions of the Korean Basketball League during the 2003–2004 season, scoring 541 points during the season. Following the season with the Orions, Spencer joined CPN Pueblo Nuevo of the Dominican Republic as an import player in 2004.
