= Ohio Valley Conference Men's Basketball Player of the Year =

American collegiate basketball award

- Awarded for: the most outstanding basketball player in the Ohio Valley Conference
- Country: United States

History
- First award: 1963
- Most recent: Aaron Nkrumah, Tennessee State

The Ohio Valley Conference Men's Basketball Player of the Year is an annual award given to the Ohio Valley Conference's (OVC) most outstanding player. The award was first given following the 1962–63 season.

Fifteen players in OVC history have claimed more than one player of the year award, the most recent of whom was Terry Taylor in 2020 and 2021. Among the repeat winners, only one—Clem Haskins of Western Kentucky—has been a three-time player of the year. Haskins achieved the feat from 1965 through 1967.

Both of the schools with the most awards left the OVC in 2022. Murray State, which has dominated the award's selection, with its players having received the award 21 times (which at the Racers' departure was equal to the total of the next three programs on the list), joined the Missouri Valley Conference. Second-place Austin Peay, with eight awards, joined the Atlantic Sun Conference. Among schools remaining in the OVC after 2022, Morehead State has the most awards with eight. Among schools that will be OVC members in the upcoming 2026–27 season, three have yet to produce a winner, but all joined the OVC in the 2020s, with Lindenwood and Southern Indiana playing their first OVC seasons in 2022–23 and Western Illinois playing its first OVC season in 2023–24. Among former members, the only ones that were members during the award's existence that did not have a winner are East Tennessee State and Little Rock. (Note: Three charter OVC members left before the award was established: Louisville after the league's first season in 1949, and Evansville and Marshall in 1952.)

Three ties have occurred for player of the year: 1976, 1983 and 2013. No OVC Men's Basketball Player of the Year has ever been selected as any national player of the year.

== Key ==
†	Co-Players of the Year
*	Awarded a national player of the year award that same season: Helms Foundation College Basketball Player of the Year (1904–05 to 1978–79); UPI College Basketball Player of the Year (1954–55 to 1995–96); Oscar Robertson Trophy (1958–59 to present); Naismith College Player of the Year (1968–69 to present); John R. Wooden Award (1976–77 to present)
Player (X)	Denotes the number of times the player has been awarded the OVC Player of the Year award at that point

== Winners ==
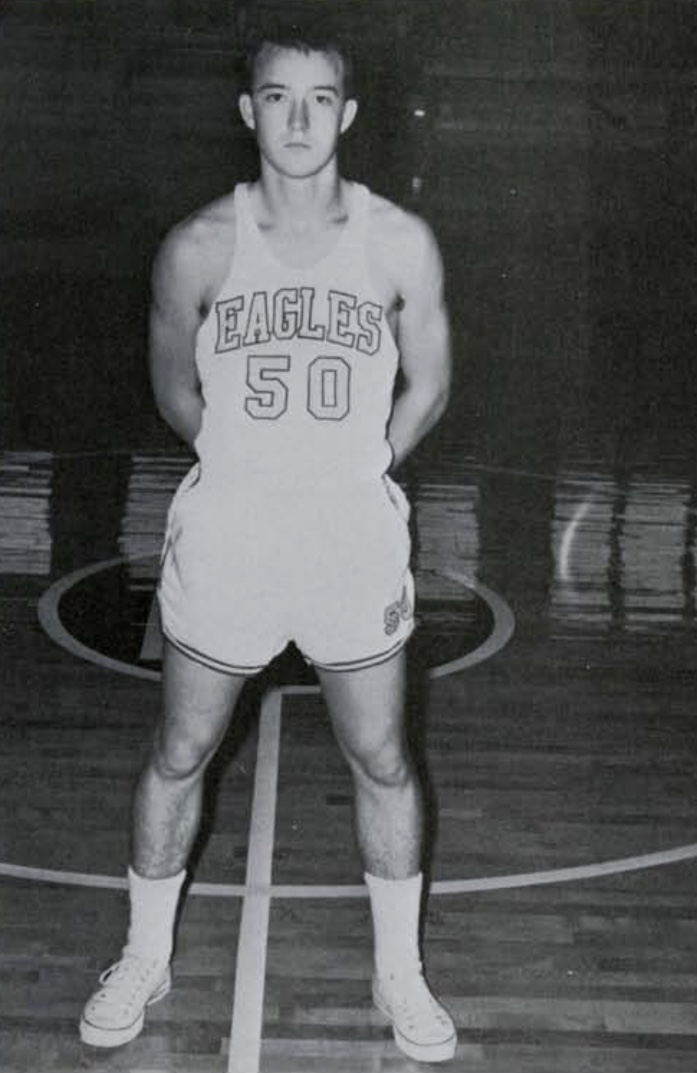
Harold Sergent, Morehead State, 1963

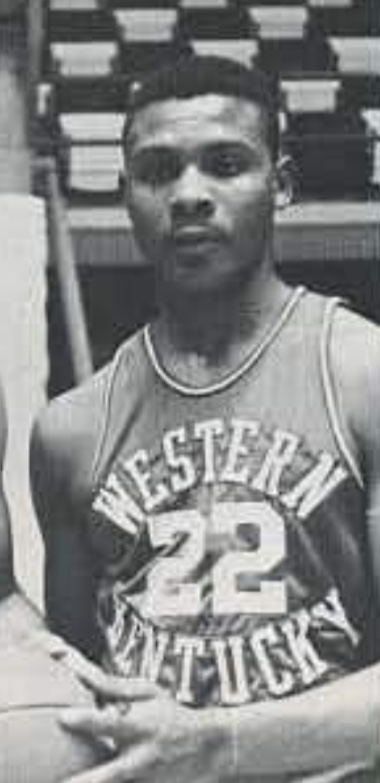
Clem Haskins, Western Kentucky, 1965 through 1967

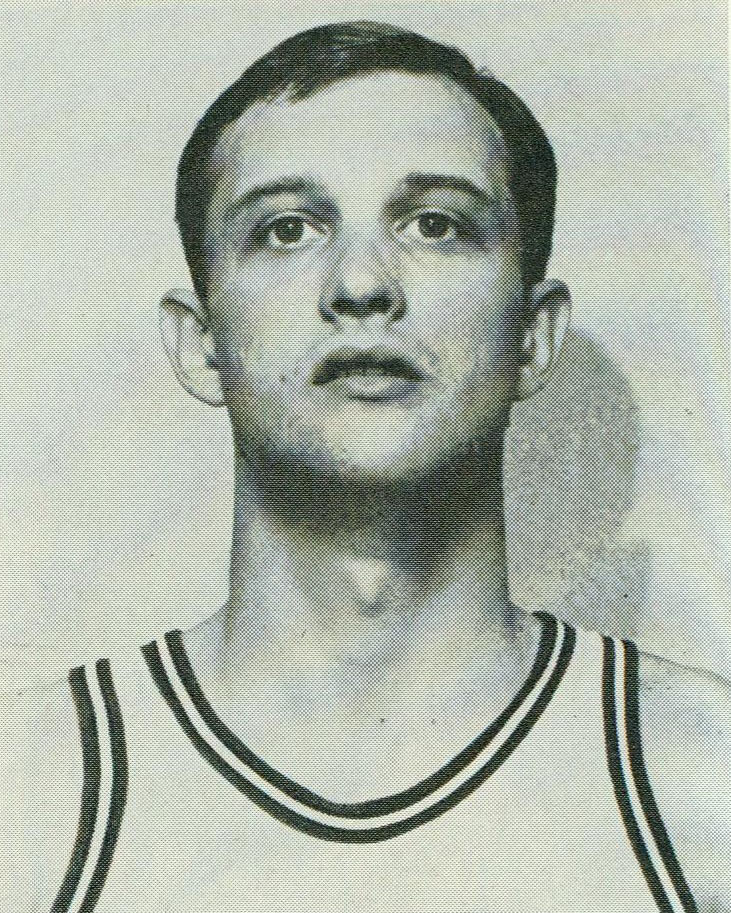
Wayne Chapman, Western Kentucky, 1968

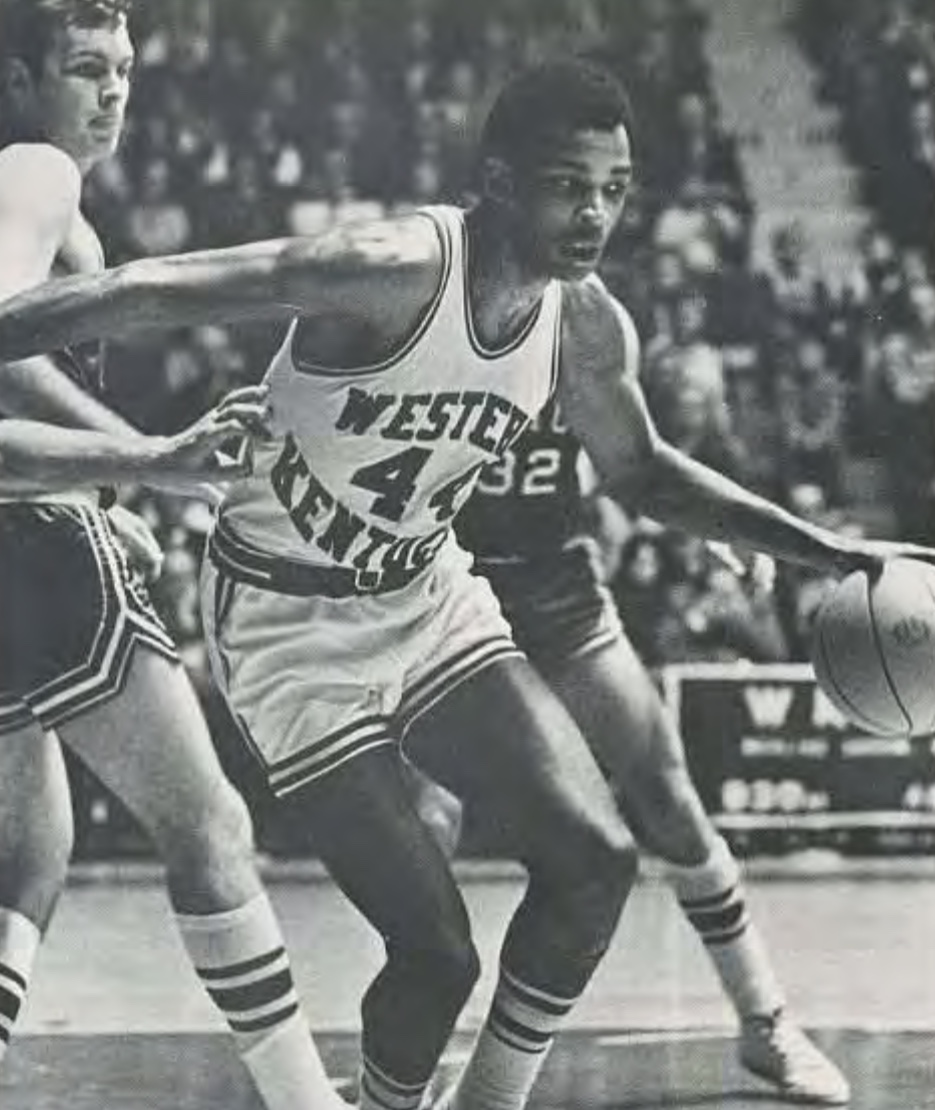
Jim McDaniels, Western Kentucky, 1970 and 1971

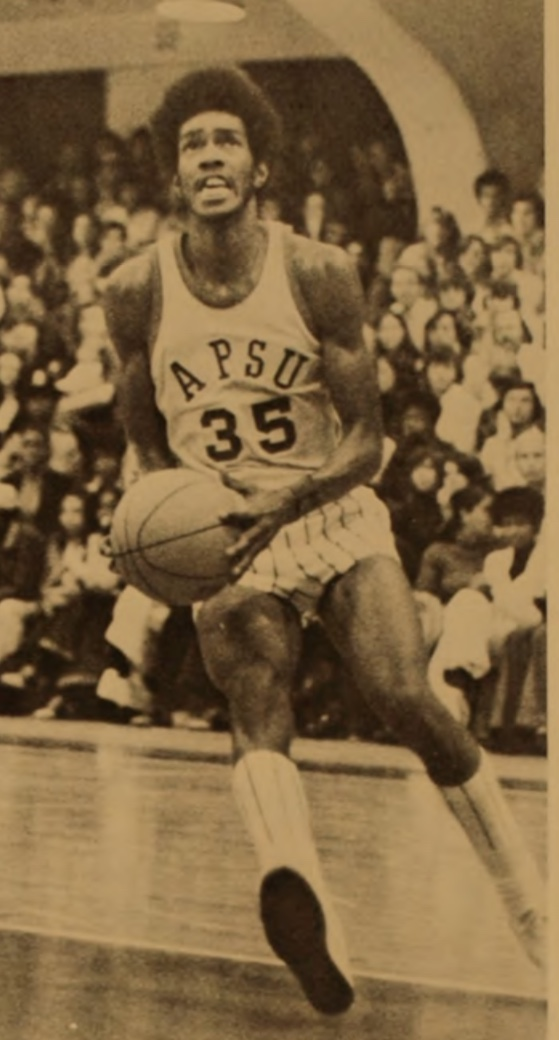
Fly Williams, Austin Peay, 1974

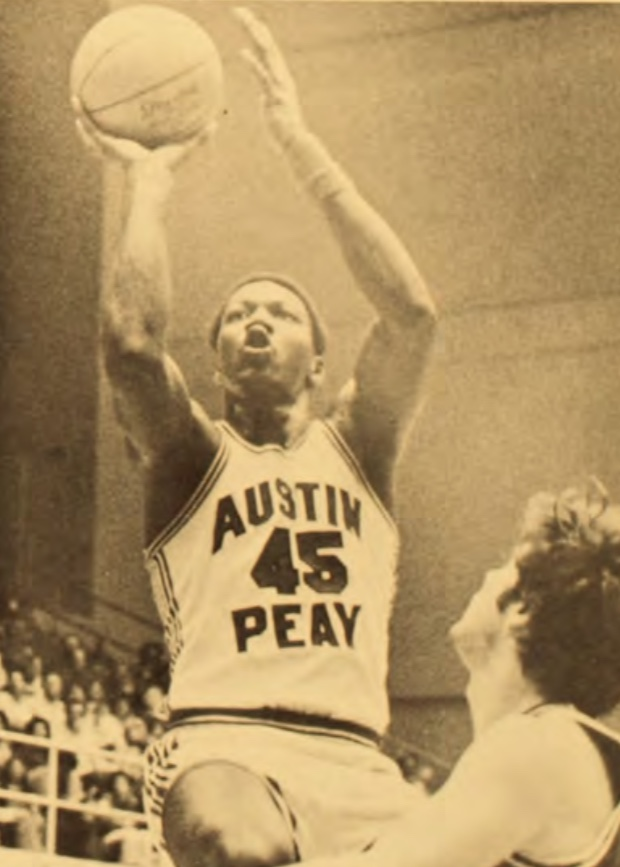
Otis Howard, Austin Peay, 1977 and 1978

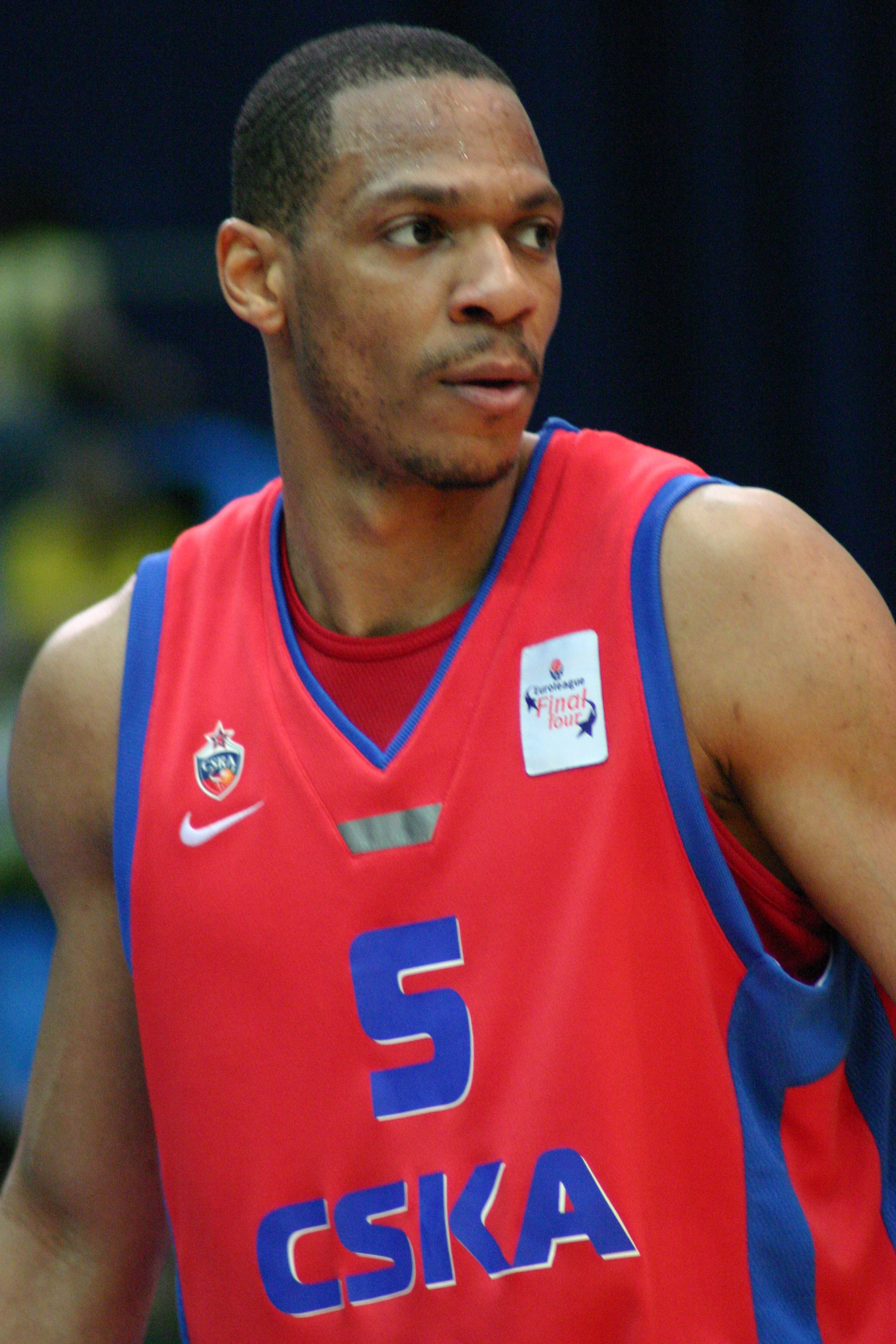
Marcus Brown, Murray State, 1995 and 1996

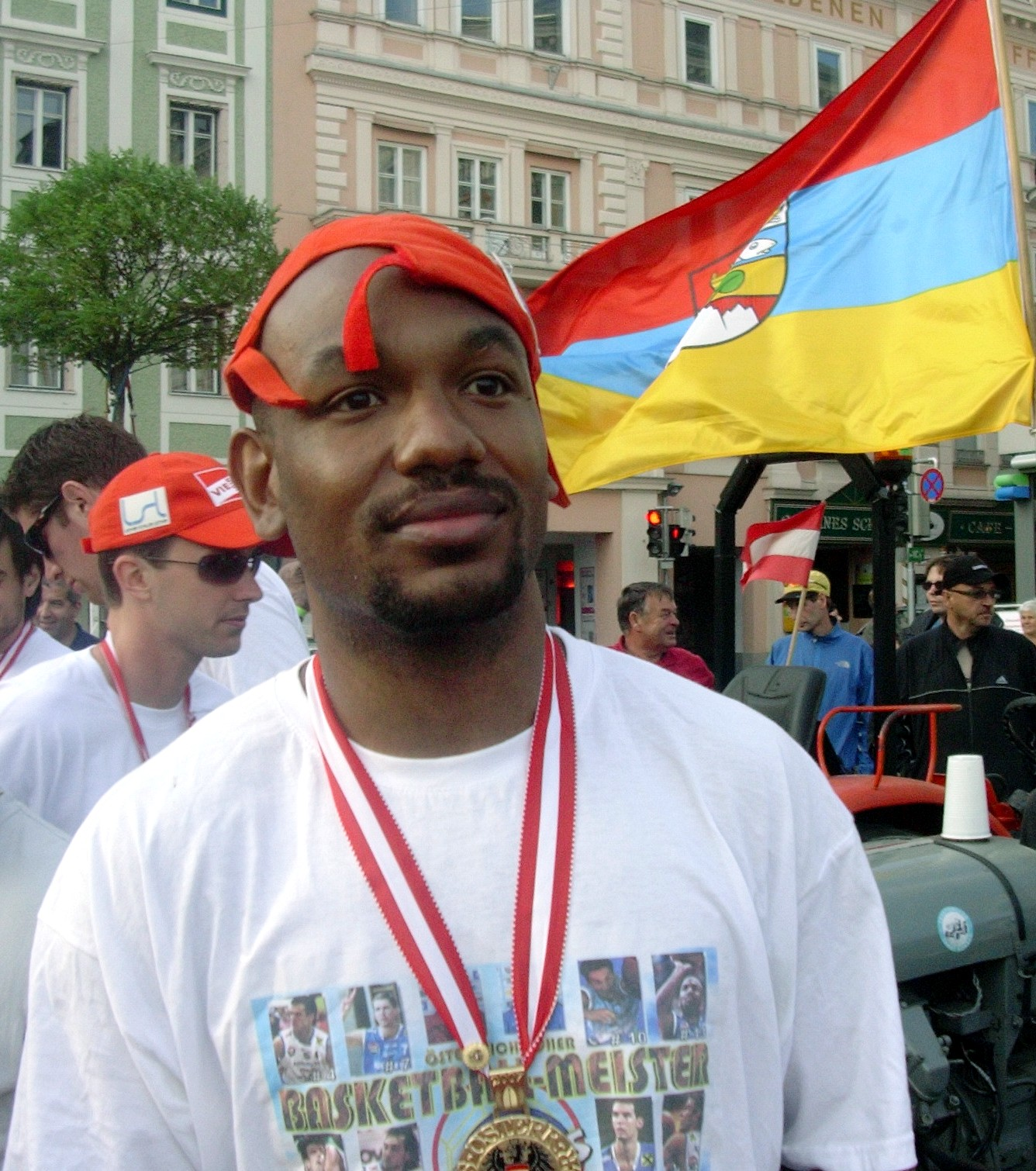
De'Teri Mayes, Murray State, 1998

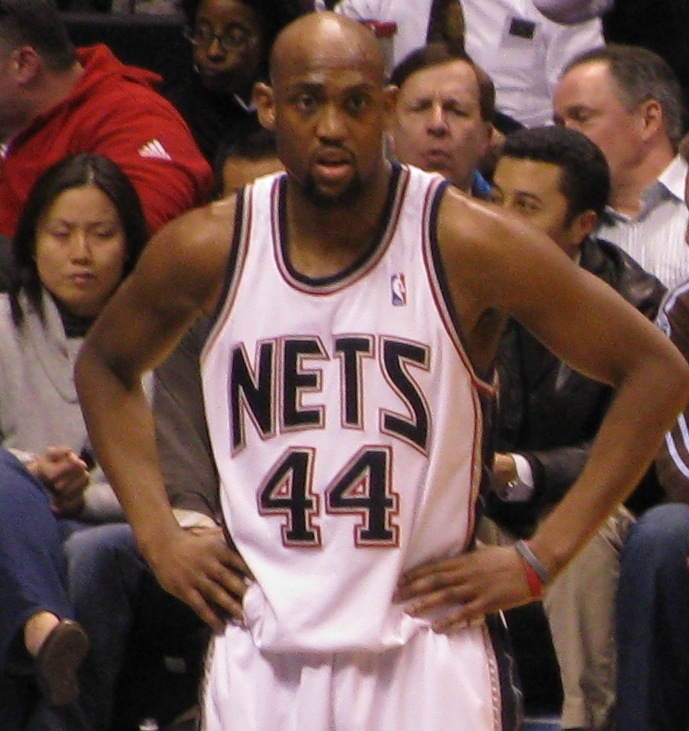
Trenton Hassell, Austin Peay, 2001

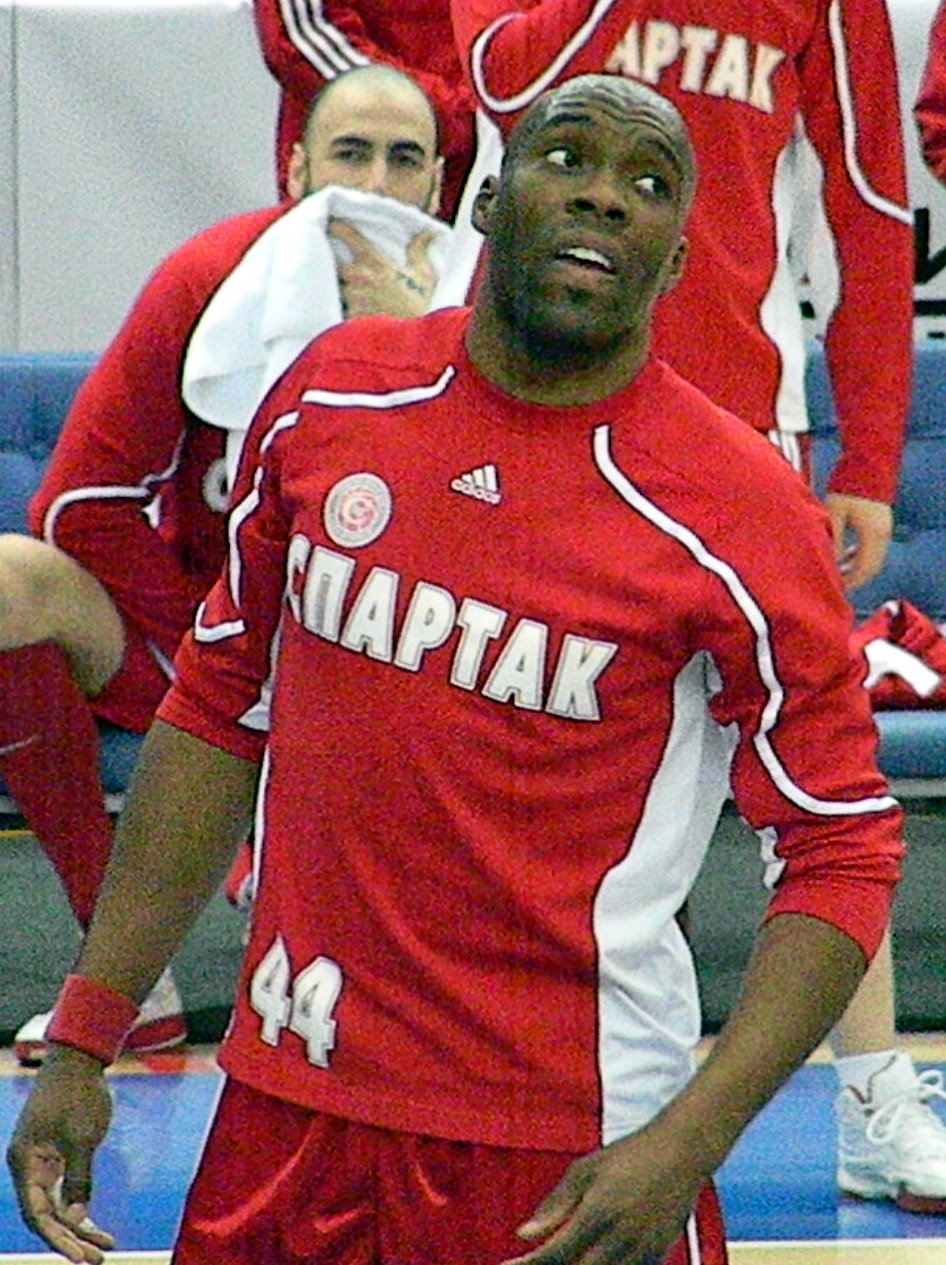
Henry Domercant, Eastern Illinois, 2002

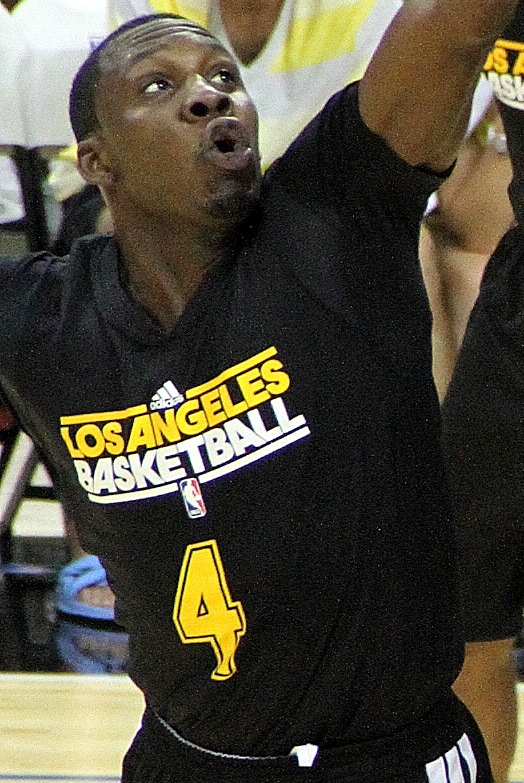
Lester Hudson, UT Martin, 2008 and 2009

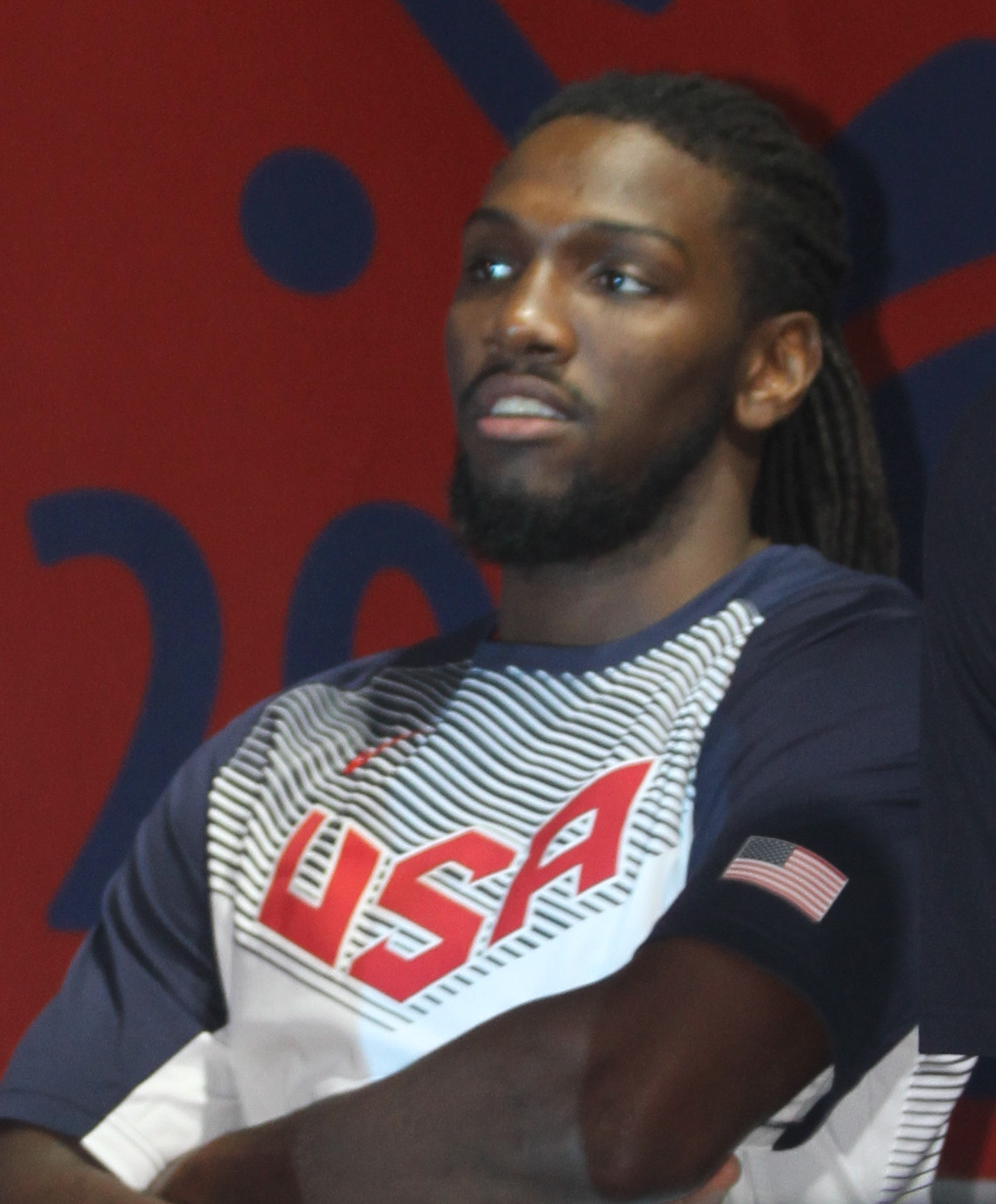
Kenneth Faried, Morehead State, 2010 and 2011

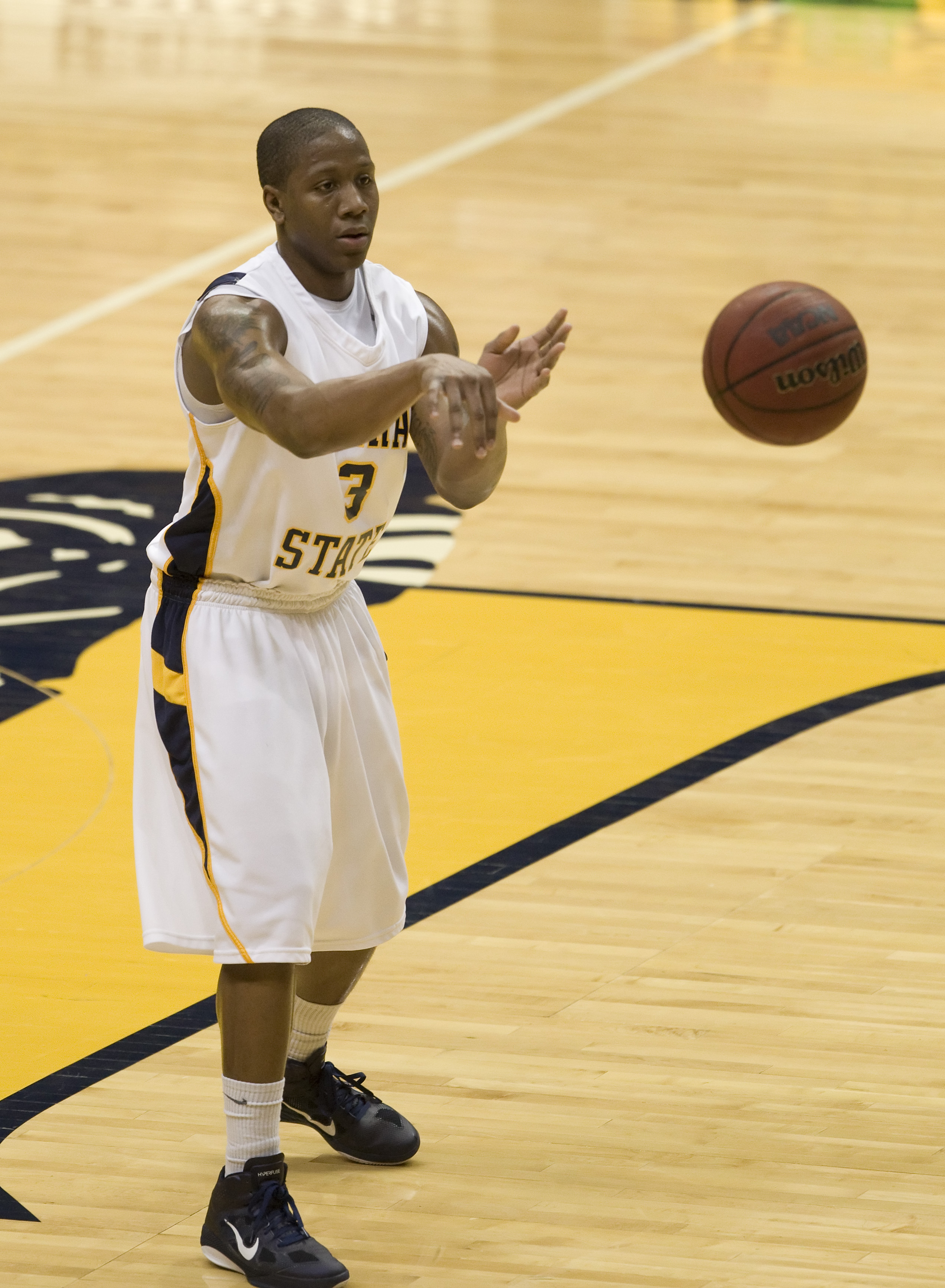
Isaiah Canaan, Murray State, 2012 and 2013

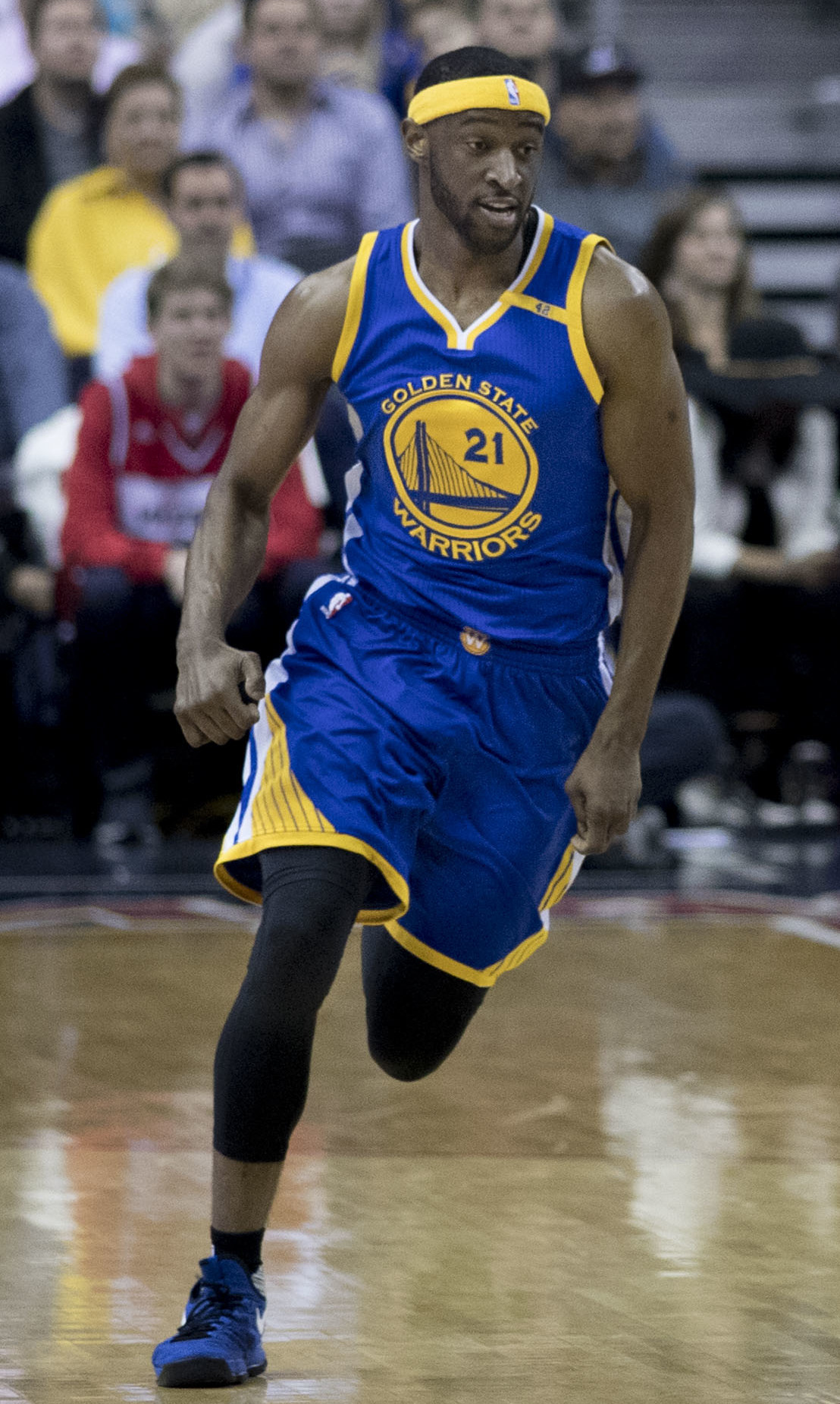
Ian Clark, Belmont, 2013

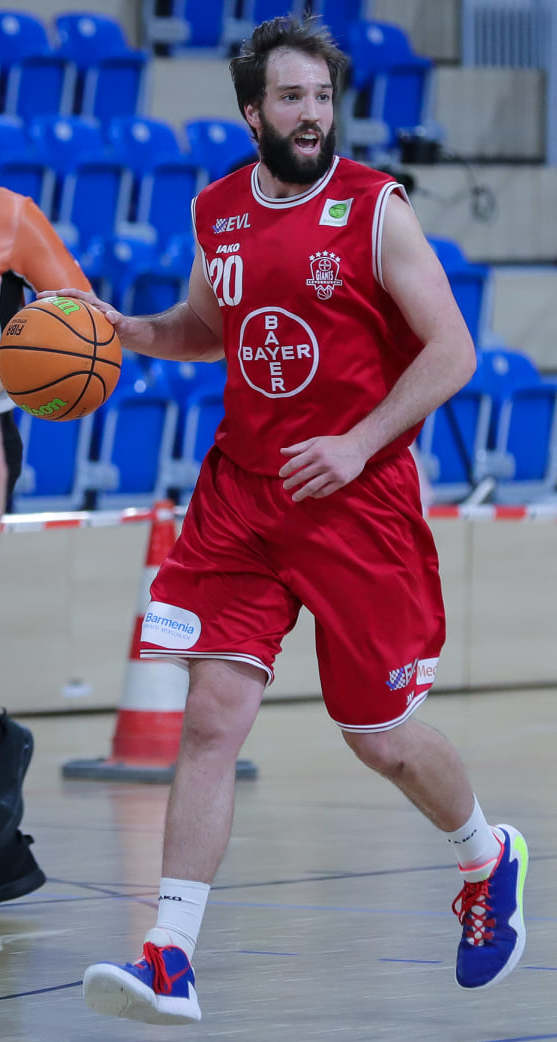
J. J. Mann, Belmont, 2014

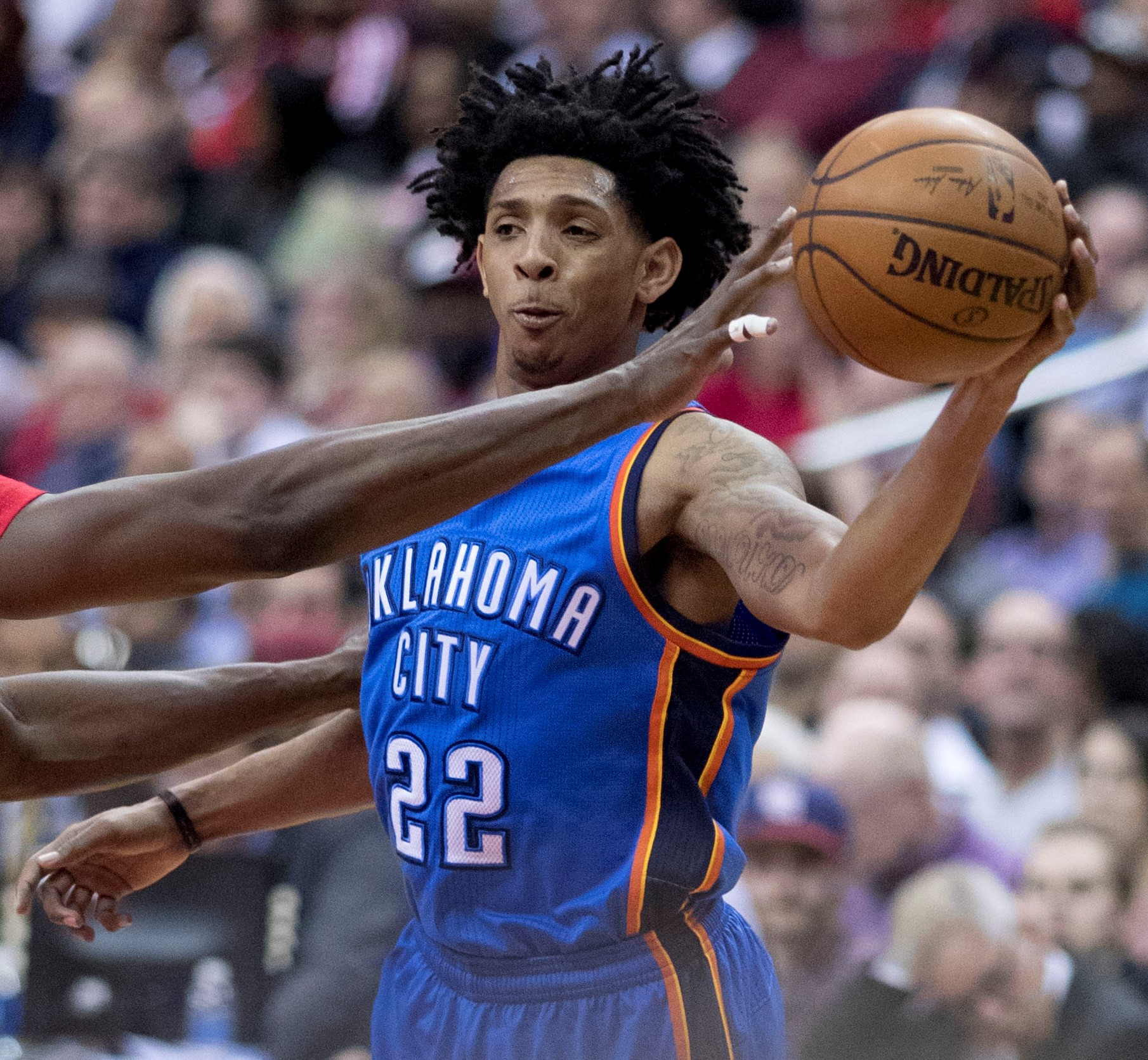
Cameron Payne, Murray State, 2015

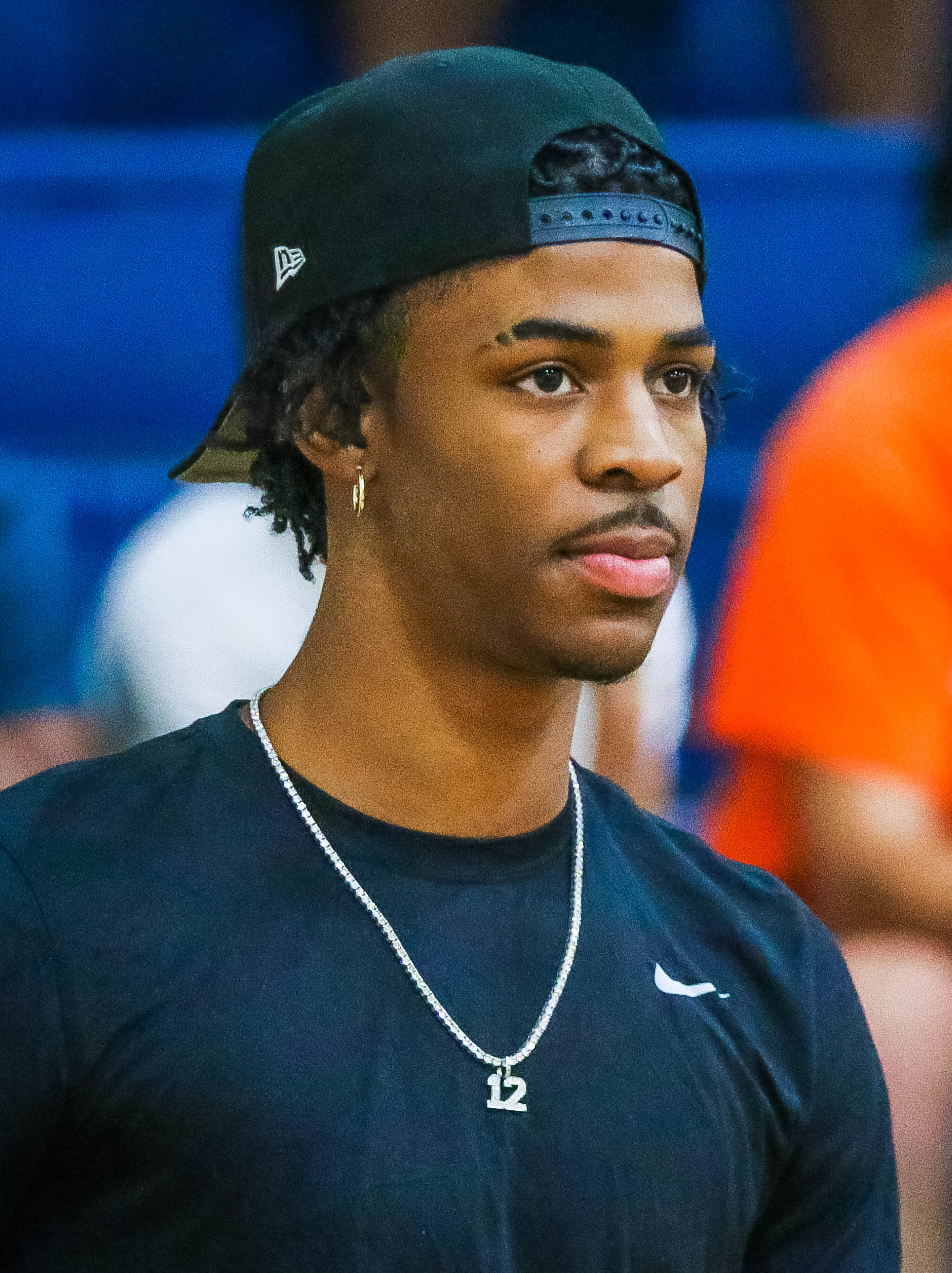
Ja Morant, Murray State, 2019

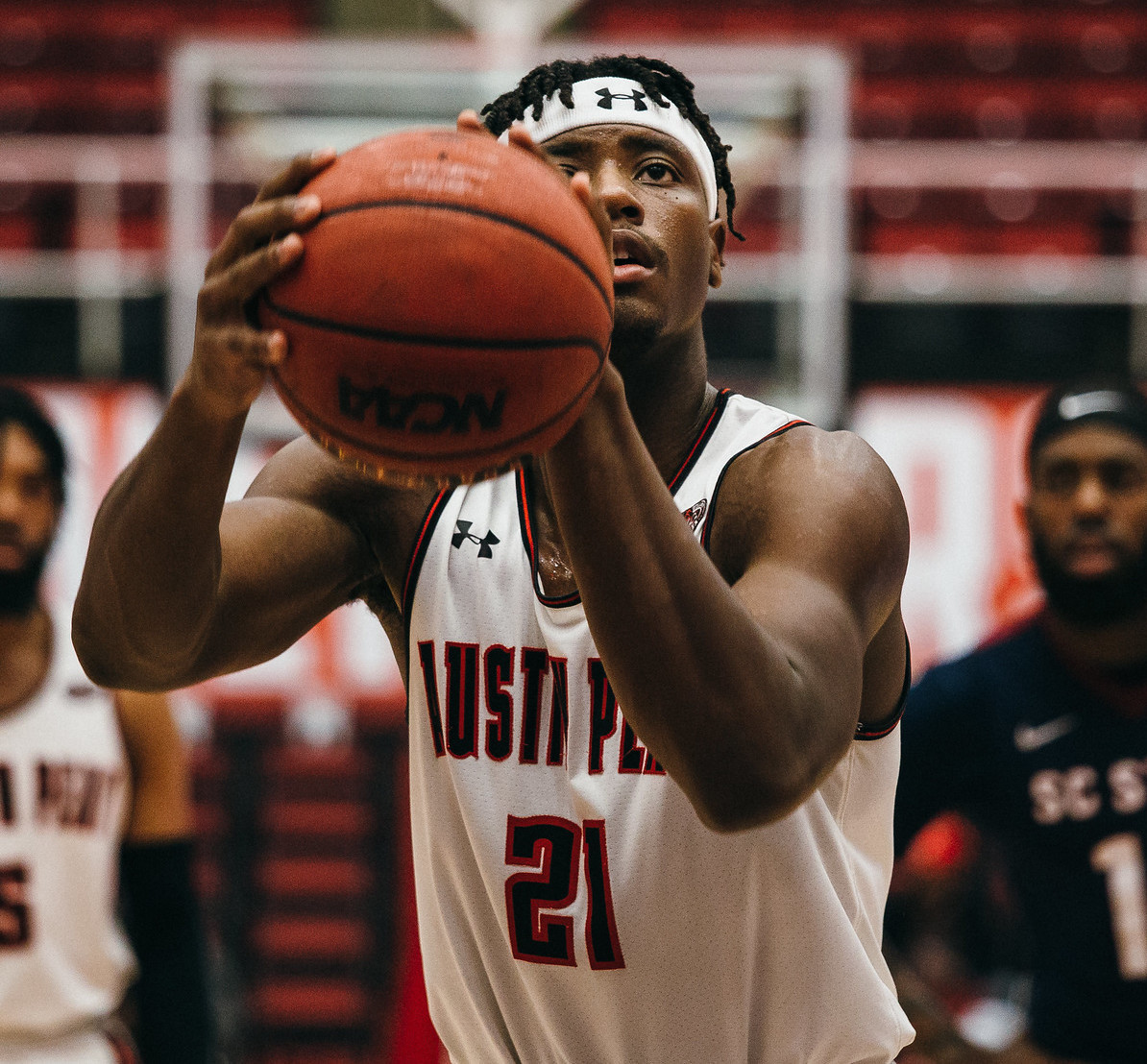
Terry Taylor, Austin Peay, 2020 and 2021

Season	Player	School	Position	Class	Reference
1962–63	Harold Sergent	Morehead State	PG	Sophomore	
1963–64	Jim Jennings	Murray State	F	Senior	
1964–65	Clem Haskins	Western Kentucky	SG	Sophomore	
1965–66	Clem Haskins (2)	Western Kentucky	SG	Junior	
1966–67	Clem Haskins (3)	Western Kentucky	SG	Senior	
1967–68	Wayne Chapman	Western Kentucky	SG / SF	Senior	
1968–69	Claude Virden	Murray State	SF	Junior	
1969–70	Jim McDaniels	Western Kentucky	C	Junior	
1970–71	Jim McDaniels (2)	Western Kentucky	C	Senior	
1971–72	Les Taylor	Murray State	SF	Junior	
1972–73	Les Taylor (2)	Murray State	SF	Senior	
1973–74	Fly Williams	Austin Peay	PG	Sophomore	
1974–75	George Sorrell	Middle Tennessee	PF	Senior	
1975–76^{†}	Johnny Britt	Western Kentucky	PG	Senior	
1975–76^{†}	Tim Sisneros	Middle Tennessee	C	Senior	
1976–77	Otis Howard	Austin Peay	SF	Junior	
1977–78	Otis Howard (2)	Austin Peay	SF	Senior	
1978–79	James Tillman	Eastern Kentucky	F	Junior	
1979–80	Gary Hooker	Murray State	PF	Senior	
1980–81	Jerry Beck	Middle Tennessee	PF	Junior	
1981–82	Jerry Beck (2)	Middle Tennessee	PF	Senior	
1982–83^{†}	Glen Green	Murray State	SF	Senior	
1982–83^{†}	Joe Jakubick	Akron	SG	Junior	
1983–84	Joe Jakubick (2)	Akron	SG	Senior	
1984–85	Stephen Kite	Tennessee Tech	F	Junior	
1985–86	Marcel Boyce	Akron	SF	Junior	
1986–87	Bob McCann	Morehead State	PF	Senior	
1987–88	Jeff Martin	Murray State	SG	Junior	
1988–89	Jeff Martin (2)	Murray State	SG	Senior	
1989–90	Popeye Jones	Murray State	PF	Sophomore	
1990–91	Popeye Jones (2)	Murray State	PF	Junior	
1991–92	Brett Roberts	Morehead State	SF	Senior	
1992–93	Carlos Rogers	Tennessee State	C	Junior	
1993–94	Carlos Rogers (2)	Tennessee State	C	Senior	
1994–95	Marcus Brown	Murray State	SG	Junior	
1995–96	Marcus Brown (2)	Murray State	SG	Senior	
1996–97	Bubba Wells	Austin Peay	SF	Senior	
1997–98	De'Teri Mayes	Murray State	PG / SG	Senior	
1998–99	Bud Eley	Southeast Missouri State	C	Senior	
1999–00	Aubrey Reese	Murray State	PG	Senior	
2000–01	Trenton Hassell	Austin Peay	SF / SG	Junior	
2001–02	Henry Domercant	Eastern Illinois	SG	Junior	
2002–03	Ricky Minard	Morehead State	PG / SG	Junior	
2003–04	Cuthbert Victor	Murray State	SF	Senior	
2004–05	Willie Jenkins	Tennessee Tech	C / PF	Senior	
2005–06	J. Robert Merritt	Samford	PF	Senior	
2006–07	Drake Reed	Austin Peay	SF	Sophomore	
2007–08	Lester Hudson	UT Martin	PG	Junior	
2008–09	Lester Hudson (2)	UT Martin	PG	Senior	
2009–10	Kenneth Faried	Morehead State	PF / C	Junior	
2010–11	Kenneth Faried (2)	Morehead State	PF / C	Senior	
2011–12	Isaiah Canaan	Murray State	PG / SG	Junior	
2012–13^{†}	Isaiah Canaan (2)	Murray State	PG / SG	Senior	
2012–13^{†}	Ian Clark	Belmont	SG	Senior	
2013–14	J. J. Mann	Belmont	SF	Senior	
2014–15	Cameron Payne	Murray State	PG	Sophomore	
2015–16	Evan Bradds	Belmont	PF	Junior	
2016–17	Evan Bradds (2)	Belmont	PF	Senior	
2017–18	Jonathan Stark	Murray State	PG	Senior	
2018–19	Ja Morant	Murray State	PG	Sophomore	
2019–20	Terry Taylor	Austin Peay	PF	Junior	
2020–21	Terry Taylor (2)	Austin Peay	PF	Senior	
2021–22	KJ Williams	Murray State	PF	Senior	
2022–23	Mark Freeman	Morehead State	PG	Senior	
2023–24	Riley Minix	Morehead State	SF	Graduate	
2024–25	Ray'Sean Taylor	SIU Edwardsville	SG	Senior	
2025–26	Aaron Nkrumah	Tennessee State	SG	Senior	

== Winners by school ==
School (year joined)	Winners	Years
Murray State (1948) (Note: Austin Peay State University, Belmont University, and Murray State University left the OVC in 2022. Peay joined the Atlantic Sun Conference (then branded as the ASUN Conference), and Belmont and Murray State joined the Missouri Valley Conference. In 2026, Peay will move to the United Athletic Conference (UAC).)	21	1964, 1969, 1972, 1973, 1980, 1983^{†}, 1988, 1989, 1990, 1991, 1995, 1996, 1998, 2000, 2004, 2012, 2013^{†}, 2015, 2018, 2019, 2022
Austin Peay (1962)	8	1974, 1977, 1978, 1997, 2001, 2007, 2020, 2021
Morehead State (1948)	8	1963, 1987, 1992, 2003, 2010, 2011, 2023, 2024
Western Kentucky (1948) (Note: Western Kentucky University left in 1982 to join the Sun Belt Conference, and is now in Conference USA (CUSA).)	7	1965, 1966, 1967, 1968^{†}, 1970, 1971, 1976^{†}
Belmont (2012)	4	2013^{†}, 2014, 2016, 2017
Middle Tennessee (1952) (Note: Middle Tennessee State University left in 2000 to join the Sun Belt Conference, and is now in CUSA.)	4	1975, 1976^{†}, 1981, 1982
Akron (1980) (Note: The University of Akron left in 1987 to become an Independent. The Zips are now in the Mid-American Conference.)	3	1983^{†}, 1984, 1986
Tennessee State (1986)	3	1993, 1994, 2026
Tennessee Tech (1949) (Note: Tennessee Tech University will leave for the Southern Conference (SoCon) in 2026.)	2	1985, 2005
UT Martin (1992)	2	2008, 2009
Eastern Illinois (1996)	1	2002
Eastern Kentucky (1948) (Note: Eastern Kentucky University and Jacksonville State University left in 2021 to join the Atlantic Sun Conference (then branded as the ASUN Conference). JSU moved to CUSA in 2023. EKU will move to the UAC in 2026.)	1	1979
Samford (2003) (Note: Samford University left in 2008 to join the SoCon.)	1	2006
SIU Edwardsville (2008)	1	2025
Southeast Missouri State (1991)	1	1999
East Tennessee State (1958) (Note: East Tennessee State University left in 1978 to join the SoCon. The Buccaneers returned to the SoCon in 2014 after nine seasons in the Atlantic Sun Conference.)	0	—
Jacksonville State (2003)	0	—
Lindenwood (2022)	0	—
Little Rock (2022) (Note: The University of Arkansas at Little Rock will leave for the UAC in 2026.)	0	—
Southern Indiana (2022)	0	—
Western Illinois (2023)	0	—
