= Popeye Jones =

American basketball player and coach (born 1970)

Orlando Magic
- Title: Assistant coach
- League: NBA

Personal information
- Born: June 17, 1970 (age 56) Dresden, Tennessee, U.S.
- Listed height: 6 ft 8 in (2.03 m)
- Listed weight: 265 lb (120 kg)

Career information
- High school: Dresden (Dresden, Tennessee)
- College: Murray State (1988–1992)
- NBA draft: 1992: 2nd round, 41st overall pick
- Drafted by: Houston Rockets
- Playing career: 1992–2004
- Position: Power forward
- Number: 54, 4, 50
- Coaching career: 2010–present

Career history

Playing
- 1992–1993: Aresium Milano
- 1993–1996: Dallas Mavericks
- 1996–1998: Toronto Raptors
- 1998–1999: Boston Celtics
- 1999–2000: Denver Nuggets
- 2000–2002: Washington Wizards
- 2002–2003: Dallas Mavericks
- 2003–2004: Golden State Warriors

Career highlights
- As player: NCAA rebounding leader (1992); 2× OVC Player of the Year (1990, 1991); 3× First-team All-OVC (1990–1992); No. 54 retired by Murray State Racers; Tennessee Mr. Basketball (1988); As assistant coach: NBA champion (2023)

Career NBA statistics
- Points: 3,726 (7.0 ppg)
- Rebounds: 3,981 (7.4 rpg)
- Assists: 696 (1.3 apg)
- Stats at NBA.com
- Stats at Basketball Reference

Ronald Jerome "Popeye" Jones (born June 17, 1970) is an American professional basketball coach and former player who currently serves as an assistant coach for the Orlando Magic of the National Basketball Association (NBA).

== College career ==
Born in Dresden, Tennessee, Jones played college basketball for Murray State University. He finished his college career as a three-time All-Ohio Valley Conference selection, a two-time honorable mention All-America and was named OVC Player of the Year in 1990 and 1991. Jones was honored as the OVC's Athlete of the Year in 1991 and 1992. He is one of only ten MSU men's basketball players to have his jersey retired; his #54 hangs in the rafters of the CFSB Center in Murray, Kentucky. Jones ranks fourth on Murray State's all-time scoring list with 2,057 points. He is also Murray State's all-time leader in rebounds with 1,374, and led the nation in that category in the 1990–91 season. He is the only men's player in Murray State history to record more than 2,000 points and 1,000 rebounds.

== Playing career ==
After college, he was selected by the Houston Rockets in the second round (41st overall) of the 1992 NBA draft, but his rights were traded to the Dallas Mavericks for those of former University of Michigan center Eric Riley. After playing professionally in Europe for a season, he played for the Mavericks for three seasons until being traded to the Toronto Raptors for Riley's former Michigan Wolverines teammate, shooting guard Jimmy King.

In 1998, Jones, Kenny Anderson, and Žan Tabak were traded to the Boston Celtics for Roy Rogers, Dee Brown, Chauncey Billups, and John Thomas. The following year, Jones was traded with Ron Mercer and Dwayne Schintzius to the Denver Nuggets for Eric Washington, Danny Fortson and Eric Williams. During the 2000 offseason, Jones was traded with a 2002 second-round draft pick to the Washington Wizards for Tracy Murray. He had a second stint with the Mavericks during the 2002–03 season, but played in only 26 of 82 games. The following year, Jones was acquired alongside Nick Van Exel, Antoine Rigaudeau, Avery Johnson, and Evan Eschmeyer by the Golden State Warriors in a blockbuster trade for Danny Fortson, Antawn Jamison, Jiří Welsch and Chris Mills. This trade marked the second time Fortson and Jones were traded for each other. In 2004, the Warriors waived Jones, effectively ending his career.

In a game on March 10, 1994, Jones collected 12 offensive rebounds without a single defensive rebound. The 12 offensive boards without recording a defensive rebound stands as an NBA record since the league started tracking the category in 1973–74.

His best season was in 1995–96 with the Mavericks when he averaged 11.3 points and 10.8 rebounds per game while making 14 of 39 three-point attempts, after averaging 10.3 points and 10.6 rebounds the previous year. He holds NBA career per game averages of 7.0 points and 7.4 rebounds. He once secured 28 rebounds in a single game for the Mavericks in the 1995–96 season, still a team record.

== Coaching career ==
Following his 11-year career year in the NBA, Jones decided to pursue coaching professional basketball. He first worked as a player development coach with the Dallas Mavericks. After spending the 2007–08 through the 2009–10 season with the Mavericks, he earned a coaching job with the New Jersey / Brooklyn Nets as an assistant coach.

On August 14, 2013, he was hired as an assistant coach for the Indiana Pacers. Jones worked with All-Stars like Roy Hibbert and Paul George, and reached the Eastern Conference Finals his first two years with the team.

On November 9, 2020, the Philadelphia 76ers hired Jones as an assistant coach under Doc Rivers.

On August 23, 2021, the Denver Nuggets announced that they had hired Jones as assistant coach. Jones won his first NBA championship when the Nuggets defeated the Miami Heat in the 2023 NBA Finals. On May 30, 2025, it was announced that Jones and the Nuggets would be parting ways.

On July 9, 2025, the Dallas Mavericks hired Jones as part of their coaching staff under head coach Jason Kidd.

On July 6, 2026, the Orlando Magic hired Jones as part of their coaching staff under head coach Sean Sweeney.

== Personal life ==
Jones and his wife Amy have three sons. The two youngest, Seth and Caleb, are professional ice hockey players. During Jones's tenure with the Denver Nuggets, he approached Joe Sakic of the Colorado Avalanche about his son playing ice hockey. Sakic advised the elder Jones to enroll his sons in skating classes first.

== Career statistics ==
Legend
GP	Games played	GS	Games started	MPG	Minutes per game
FG%	Field goal percentage	3P%	3-point field goal percentage	FT%	Free throw percentage
RPG	Rebounds per game	APG	Assists per game	SPG	Steals per game
BPG	Blocks per game	PPG	Points per game	**Bold**	Career high

=== NBA ===
==== Regular season ====
Year	Team	GP	GS	MPG	FG%	3P%	FT%	RPG	APG	SPG	BPG	PPG
1993–94	Dallas	**81**	47	21.9	.479	.000	.729	7.5	1.2	**.8**	.4	5.8
1994–95	Dallas	80	**80**	29.8	.443	.083	.645	10.6	**2.0**	.4	.3	10.3
1995–96	Dallas	68	68	**34.1**	.446	.359	.767	**10.8**	1.9	**.8**	.4	**11.3**
1996–97	Toronto	79	61	30.6	**.480**	.077	.818	8.6	1.1	.7	**.5**	7.8
1997–98	Toronto	14	4	25.1	.409	**.667**	.737	7.3	1.3	.7	.2	8.6
1998–99	Boston	18	2	11.4	.392	.000	**.824**	2.9	.8	.3	.0	3.0
1999–00	Denver	40	1	8.3	.423	**.667**	.737	2.6	.5	.1	.2	2.6
2000–01	Washington	45	1	14.2	.392	.167	.745	4.9	.7	.4	.2	3.6
2001–02	Washington	79	40	24.3	.437	.364	.811	7.3	1.6	.6	.2	7.0
2002–03	Dallas	26	0	8.5	.387	–	.455	2.3	.3	.2	.0	2.0
2003–04	Golden State	5	0	2.0	.000	–	–	.2	.0	.0	.0	.0
Career		535	304	23.5	.447	.281	.751	7.4	1.3	.6	.3	7.0

=== College ===
*	Led NCAA Division I

Year	Team	GP	GS	MPG	FG%	3P%	FT%	RPG	APG	SPG	BPG	PPG
1988–89	Murray State	30	1	17.3	.489	–	.754	4.6	.7	.6	.2	5.8
1989–90	Murray State	30	30	**34.6**	**.500**	**.441**	.757	11.2	2.0	**1.9**	.6	19.5
1990–91	Murray State	**33**	**32**	31.9	.493	.219	.711	14.2	2.1	1.2	**1.2**	20.2
1991–92	Murray State	30	29	33.1	.488	.389	**.778**	**14.4***	**2.4**	1.4	.9	**21.1**
Career		123	92	29.3	.493	.345	.751	11.2	1.8	1.3	.7	16.7

== See also ==
- List of NCAA Division I men's basketball season rebounding leaders
- List of NCAA Division I men's basketball players with 2,000 points and 1,000 rebounds
