= List of Murray State Racers men's basketball head coaches =

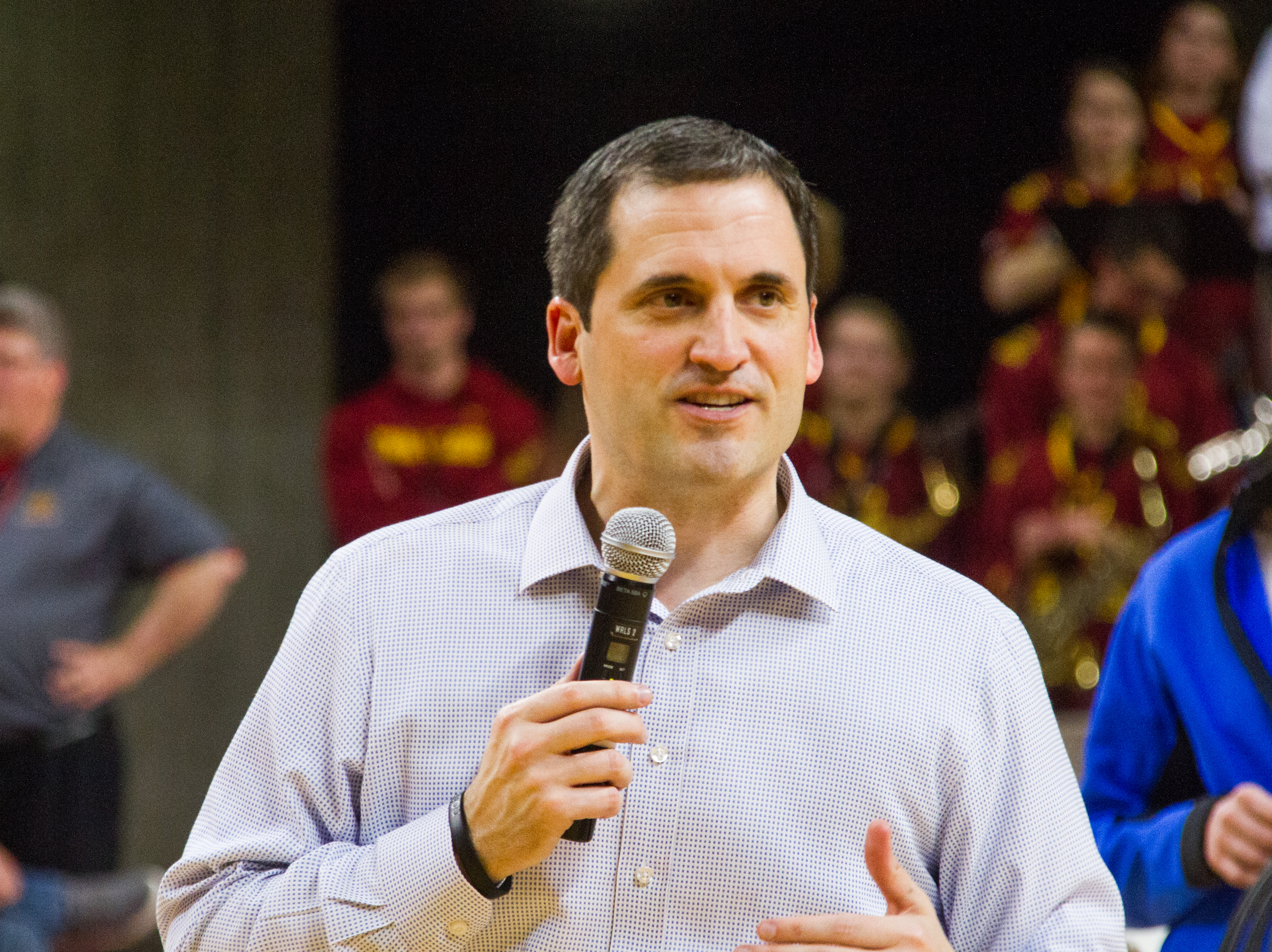
Steve Prohm, the current head coach of the Murray State Racers.

The following is a list of Murray State Racers men's basketball head coaches. There have been 16 head coaches of the Racers in their 98-season history.

Murray State's current head coach is Steve Prohm. He was hired for his second stint as the Racers' head coach in March 2022, replacing Matt McMahon, who left to become the head coach at LSU.

No.	Tenure	Coach	Years	Record	Pct.
1	1925–1941; 1947–1948*	Carlisle Cutchin	17	266–102	.723
2	1941–1942	Rice Mountjoy	1	18–4	.818
3	1942–1947 (Note: Miller resigned in December 1947. Carlisle Cutchin served as interim head coach for the remainder of the 1947–48 season.)	John Miller	6	63–50	.558
4	1948–1954	Harlan Hodges	6	105–65	.618
5	1954–1958	Rex Alexander	1	49–55	.471
6	1958–1974	Cal Luther	16	241–154	.610
7	1974–1978	Fred Overton	4	44–59	.427
8	1978–1985	Ron Greene	7	119–78	.604
9	1985–1991	Steve Newton	6	116–65	.641
10	1991–1995	Scott Edgar	4	79–40	.664
11	1995–1998	Mark Gottfried	3	68–24	.739
12	1998–2003	Tevester Anderson	5	103–52	.665
13	2003–2006	Mick Cronin	3	69–24	.742
14	2006–2011	Billy Kennedy	5	107–53	.669
15	2011–2015; 2022–present	Steve Prohm	5	104–29	.782
16	2015–2022	Matt McMahon	7	154–67	.697
Totals		16 coaches	98 seasons	1,705–921	.649
Records updated through end of 2022–23 season * - Denotes interim head coach. Source
