= List of Pepperdine Waves men's basketball seasons =

This is a list of seasons completed by the Pepperdine Waves men's college basketball team.

== Seasons ==
Statistics overview
Season	Coach	Overall	Conference	Standing	Postseason
Wade Ruby (Independent) (1938–1939)
1938–39	Wade Ruby	16-13			
Wade Ruby:		16–13 (.552)			
Al Duer (Independent) (1939–1948)
1939–40	Al Duer	15–11			
1940–41	Al Duer	10–15			
1941–42	Al Duer	19–7			NAIA first round
1942–43	Al Duer	26–9			NAIA Elite Eight
1943–44	Al Duer	20–14			NCAA Elite Eight
1944–45	Al Duer	24–13			NAIA Runner-up
1945–46	Al Duer	26–9			NAIA Final Four
1946–47	Al Duer	14–13			
1947–48	Al Duer	22–11			
Al Duer:		176–102 (.633)			
Robert "Duck" Dowell (Independent) (1948–1949)
1948–49	Robert "Duck" Dowell	19–11			
Robert "Duck" Dowell (California Collegiate Athletic Association) (1949–1954)
1949–50	Robert "Duck" Dowell	21–12	8–2	1st	NAIA second round
1950–51	Robert "Duck" Dowell	25–8	10–0	1st	NAIA second round
1951–52	Robert "Duck" Dowell	20–5	7–1	1st	NAIA second round
1952–53	Robert "Duck" Dowell	18–8	8–2	1st	
1953–54	Robert "Duck" Dowell	15–10	4–6	T–4th	
Robert "Duck" Dowell (Independent) (1954–1955)
1954–55	Robert "Duck" Dowell	16–9			
Robert "Duck" Dowell (West Coast Conference) (1955–1968)
1955–56	Robert "Duck" Dowell	2–23	0–14	8th	
1956–57	Robert "Duck" Dowell	7–18	2–12	8th	
1957–58	Robert "Duck" Dowell	15–11	5–7	T–4th	
1958–59	Robert "Duck" Dowell	16–8	8–4	3rd	
1959–60	Robert "Duck" Dowell	14–11	8–4	3rd	
1960–61	Robert "Duck" Dowell	9–16	3–9	6th	
1961–62	Robert "Duck" Dowell	20–7	11–1	1st	NCAA Division I Sweet Sixteen
1962–63	Robert "Duck" Dowell	14–11	6–6	T–4th	
1963–64	Robert "Duck" Dowell	6–19	3–9	T–6th	
1964–65	Robert "Duck" Dowell	6–19	3–11	7th	
1965–66	Robert "Duck" Dowell	2–24	1–13	8th	
1966–67	Robert "Duck" Dowell	9–17	5–9	6th	
1967–68	Robert "Duck" Dowell	9–17	2–12	8th	
Robert "Duck" Dowell:		263–264 (.499)	94–122 (.435)		
Gary Colson (West Coast Conference) (1968–1979)
1968–69	Gary Colson	14–12	6–8	5th	
1969–70	Gary Colson	14–12	7–7	T–5th	
1970–71	Gary Colson	12–13	4–10	T–6th	
1971–72	Gary Colson	10–15	5–9	6th	
1972–73	Gary Colson	14–11	7–7	T–3rd	
1973–74	Gary Colson	8–18	4–10	T–6th	
1974–75	Gary Colson	17–8	8–6	3rd	
1975–76	Gary Colson	22–6	10–2	1st	NCAA Division I Sweet Sixteen
1976–77	Gary Colson	13–13	5–9	6th	
1977–78	Gary Colson	7–19	2–12	8th	
1978–79	Gary Colson	22–10	10–4	2nd	NCAA Division I second round
Gary Colson:		153–137 (.528)	68–84 (.447)		
Jim Harrick (West Coast Conference) (1979–1988)
1979–80	Jim Harrick	17–11	9–7	T–5th	NIT first round
1980–81	Jim Harrick	16–12	11–3	T–1st	
1981–82	Jim Harrick	22–7	14–0	1st	NCAA Division I second round
1982–83	Jim Harrick	20–9	10–2	1st	NCAA Division I first round
1983–84	Jim Harrick	15–13	6–6	T–4th	
1984–85	Jim Harrick	23–9	11–1	1st	NCAA Division I first round
1985–86	Jim Harrick	25–5	13–1	1st	NCAA Division I first round
1986–87	Jim Harrick	12–18	5–9	7th	
1987–88	Jim Harrick	17–13	8–6	4th	NIT first round
Jim Harrick:		167–97 (.633)	87–35 (.713)		
Tom Asbury (West Coast Conference) (1988–1994)
1988–89	Tom Asbury	20–13	10–4	T–2nd	NIT second round
1989–90	Tom Asbury	17–11	10–4	2nd	
1990–91	Tom Asbury	22–9	13–1	1st	NCAA Division I first round
1991–92	Tom Asbury	24–7	14–0	1st	NCAA Division I first round
1992–93	Tom Asbury	23–8	11–3	1st	NIT second round
1993–94	Tom Asbury	19–11	8–6	T–2nd	NCAA Division I first round
Tom Asbury:		125–59 (.679)	66–18 (.786)		
Tony Fuller (West Coast Conference) (1994–1995)
1994–95	Tony Fuller	8–19	4–10	T–6th	
Tony Fuller/Marty Wilson (West Coast Conference) (1995–1996)
1995–96	Tony Fuller; Marty Wilson^{[Note A]}	10–18	2–12	8th	
Tony Fuller:		15–27 (.357)	4–13 (.235)		
Lorenzo Romar (West Coast Conference) (1996–1999)
1996–97	Lorenzo Romar	6–21	4–10	T–6th	
1997–98	Lorenzo Romar	17–10	9–5	2nd	
1998–99	Lorenzo Romar	19–13	9–5	T–2nd	NIT first round
Lorenzo Romar:		42–44 (.488)	22–20 (.524)		
Jan van Breda Kolff (West Coast Conference) (1999–2001)
1999–00	Jan van Breda Kolff	25–9	12–2	1st	NCAA Division I second round
2000–01	Jan van Breda Kolff	22–9	12–2	2nd	NIT second round
Pepperdine:		47–18 (.723)	24–4 (.857)		
Paul Westphal (West Coast Conference) (2001–2006)
2001–02	Paul Westphal	22–9	13–1	T–1st	NCAA Division I first round
2002–03	Paul Westphal	15–13	7–7	4th	
2003–04	Paul Westphal	15–15	9–5	T–2nd	
2004–05	Paul Westphal	17–14	6–8	T–5th	
2005–06	Paul Westphal	7–20	3–11	8th	
Paul Westphal:		76–71 (.517)	38–32 (.543)		
Vance Walberg (West Coast Conference) (2006–2007)
2006–07	Vance Walberg	8–23	4–10	T–7th	
2007–08	Vance Walberg; Eric Bridgeland^{[Note B]}	11–21	4–10	6th	
Vance Walberg:		14–35 (.286)	4–12 (.250)		
Tom Asbury (West Coast Conference) (2008–2011)
2008–09	Tom Asbury	9–23	5–9	6th	
2009–10	Tom Asbury	7–24	3–11	T–6th	
2010–11	Tom Asbury	12–21	5–9	6th	
Tom Asbury:		28–68 (.292)	13–29 (.310)		
Marty Wilson (West Coast Conference) (2011–2018)
2011–12	Marty Wilson	10–19	4–12	7th	
2012–13	Marty Wilson	12–18	4–12	T-7th	
2013–14	Marty Wilson	15–16	8–10	5th	
2014–15	Marty Wilson	18–14	10–8	4th	CBI first round
2015–16	Marty Wilson	18–14	10–8	4th	CBI first round
2016–17	Marty Wilson	9–22	5–13	8th	
2017–18	Marty Wilson	6–26	2–16	10th	
Marty Wilson:		88–129 (.406)	43–79 (.352)		
Lorenzo Romar (West Coast Conference) (2018–2024)
2018–19	Lorenzo Romar	16–18	6–10	8th	
2019–20	Lorenzo Romar	16–16	8–8	6th	No postseason held
2020–21	Lorenzo Romar	15–12	7–6	4th	CBI Champion
2021–22	Lorenzo Romar	7–25	1–15	10th	
2022–23	Lorenzo Romar	9–22	2–14	10th	
2023–24	Lorenzo Romar	13–20	5–11	8th	
Lorenzo Romar:		76–113 (.402)	29–64 (.312)		
Ed Schilling (West Coast Conference) (2024–present)
2024–25	Ed Schilling	13–22	4–14	9th	
2025–26	Ed Schilling	9–23	4–14	12th	
Ed Schilling:		22–43 (.338)	8–28 (.222)		
Total:		1,316–1,252			
National champion Postseason invitational champion Conference regular season champion Conference regular season and conference tournament champion Division regular season champion Division regular season and conference tournament champion Conference tournament champion

^A. Marty Wilson finished the season as interim coach, going 3–10 and 2–9 in conference. Fuller began the season, going 7–8 and 0–3 in conference.
^B. Eric Bridgeland finished the season as interim coach, going 5–9 and 4–8 in conference. Walberg began the season, going 6–12 and 0–2 in conference.
