= Rex Alexander =

American basketball coach (1924–1982)

Biographical details
- Born: June 1, 1924; Union County, Kentucky
- Died: March 28, 1982 (aged 57); Grayson County, Kentucky, U.S.
- Education: Murray State University 1949

Playing career

Men's basketball
- 1946–1949: Murray State

Coaching career (HC unless noted)

Men's basketball
- 1949–1954: Murray State (assistant)
- 1954–1958: Murray State
- 1958–1965: Murray State (assistant)

Baseball
- 1955: Murray State

Head coaching record
- Overall: 45–54 (basketball); 5–11 (baseball)

Rex E. Alexander (June 1, 1924 – March 28, 1982) was a college basketball who was the head coach of the Murray State Racers from 1954 to 1958.

A native of Union County, Kentucky, Alexander played forward for the Racers' basketball team and graduated from the school in 1949. He served as assistant coach under Harlan Hodges until Hodges left for Idaho in 1954. After former North Carolina head coach Tom Scott turned down the job, Alexander was promoted to head coach. In his four seasons at Murray State, Alexander had a 45–54 record and no tournament appearances. He also led the Murray State baseball team to 5–11 record in 1955. He asked to be relieved of his head coaching duties after the 1957–58 season and was replaced by DePauw University head coach Cal Luther. He remained with the school as an assistant coach and professor and in 1976 he was the recipient of the Murray State Distinguished Professor award. He was inducted into the Murray State Athletics Hall of Fame in 2000.

Alexander's son David played basketball at Western Kentucky in 1971. His grandson Troy played for Southern Methodist University.

He died in an automobile accident on March 28, 1982.
