= Scott Edgar =

Scott Edgar may refer to:

- Tripod (band) member Scott Edgar
- Scott Edgar (basketball) (born 1955), American basketball coach
