= Cutchin =

Cutchin is a surname. Notable people with the surname include:

- Carlisle Cutchin (1885–1953), American football, baseball, and basketball coach and college athletics administrator
- Phil Cutchin (1920–1999), American football player and coach

== See also ==
- Robert McCutchin (1894–1973), American farmer and politician
