= Alva Duer =

American basketball player-coach

Al Duer
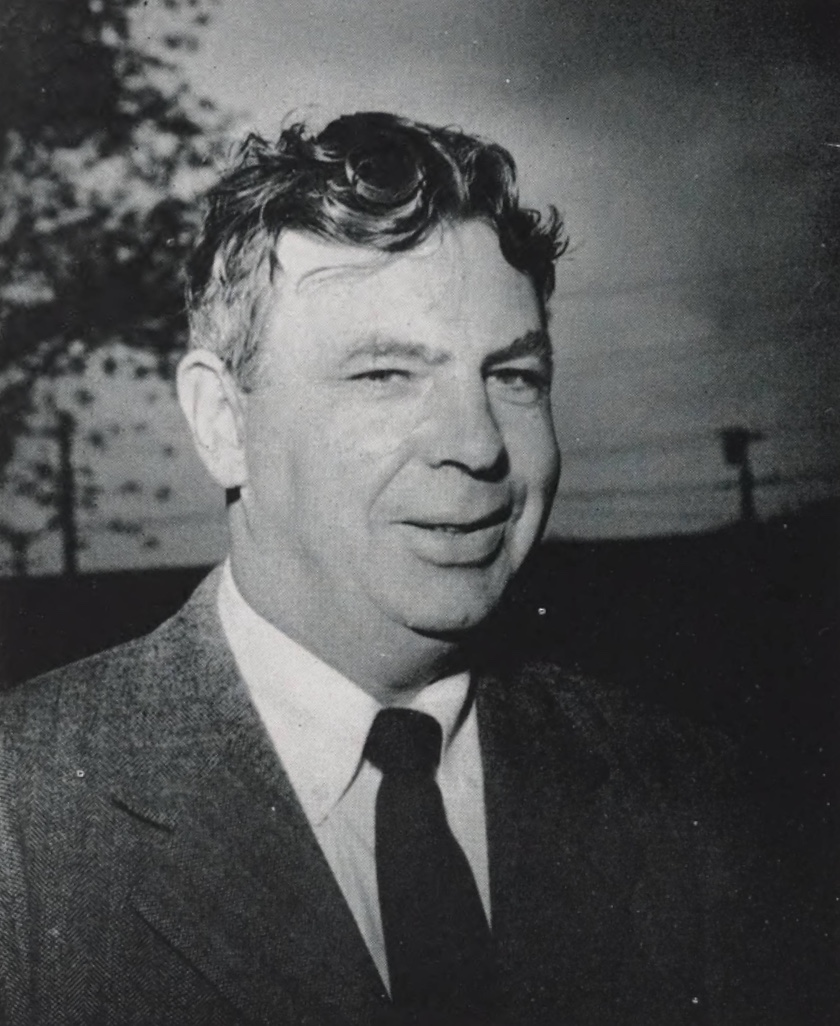
- Duer from the 1948 “Promenade”

Biographical details
- Born: November 18, 1904; Sylvia, Kansas, U.S.
- Died: November 18, 1987 (aged 83)

Coaching career (HC unless noted)
- 1939–1948: Pepperdine

Head coaching record
- Overall: 176–102
- Tournaments: NCAA: 0–2; NAIA: 8–4

Accomplishments and honors

Championships
- NAIA Runner-up (1945); NAIA Final Four (1946)

Awards
- NAIA Hall of Fame
- Basketball Hall of Fame; Inducted in 1982 (profile)
- College Basketball Hall of Fame; Inducted in 2006

Alva O. Duer (November 18, 1904 – November 18, 1987) was a college basketball coach and National Association of Intercollegiate Athletics (NAIA) and United States Olympic Committee administrator and is a member of the NAIA and Basketball Halls of Fame. He went to Stafford High School in Stafford, Kansas and was captain of the basketball team all four years he attended. He graduated from high school in 1923.

He coached college basketball at Pepperdine College in Los Angeles, California from 1939 to 1948. During that time, he had a record of 176–102 (.633). He led Pepperdine to five postseason appearances (4 NAIB and 1 NCAA), he also led Pepperdine to the 1945 NAIB final. In November, now solely as the athletic director at Pepperdine, he also added the duties of executive secretary of the NAIB in the aftermath of the passing of the association's founder Emil Liston. He would serve both roles through the spring of 1957 when he decided to step down from his roles at Pepperdine. As leader of the NAIA until 1975, he expanded the association's sports offerings from just basketball to 16 events and membership from 260 schools to over 500, including the admission of Historically black colleges and universities in 1952.

He died on his 83rd birthday in 1987.

== Head coaching record ==
Record table
Season	Team	Overall	Conference	Standing	Postseason
Pepperdine Waves (Independent) (1939–1948)
1939–40	Pepperdine	15–11			
1940–41	Pepperdine	10–15			
1941–42	Pepperdine	19–7			NAIA First Round
1942–43	Pepperdine	26–9			NAIA Quarterfinals
1943–44	Pepperdine	20–14			NCAA Elite Eight
1944–45	Pepperdine	24–13			NAIA Runner-up
1945–46	Pepperdine	26–9			NAIA Final Four
1946–47	Pepperdine	14–13			
1947–48	Pepperdine	22–11			
Pepperdine:		176–102 (.633)			
Total:		176–102 (.633)			
National champion Postseason invitational champion Conference regular season champion Conference regular season and conference tournament champion Division regular season champion Division regular season and conference tournament champion Conference tournament champion
