= Murray State Racers men's basketball =

Men's basketball program

| 2026–27 Murray State Racers men's basketball team |
- University: Murray State University
- Athletic director: Nico Yantko
- Head coach: Ryan Miller (2nd season)
- Location: Murray, Kentucky
- Arena: CFSB Center (capacity: 8,602)
- Conference: Missouri Valley
- Nickname: Racers
- Colors: Navy blue and gold

NCAA Division I tournament round of 32
- 1964, 1969, 1988, 2010, 2012, 2019, 2022

NCAA Division I tournament appearances
- 1964, 1969, 1988, 1990, 1991, 1992, 1995, 1997, 1998, 1999, 2002, 2004, 2006, 2010, 2012, 2018, 2019, 2022

Conference tournament champions
- 1951, 1964, 1988, 1990, 1991, 1992, 1995, 1997, 1998, 1999, 2002, 2004, 2006, 2010, 2012, 2018, 2019, 2022

Conference regular-season champions
- 1951, 1964, 1968, 1969, 1980, 1982, 1983, 1988, 1989, 1990, 1991, 1992, 1994, 1995, 1996, 1997, 1998, 1999, 2000, 2006, 2010, 2011, 2012, 2015, 2018, 2019, 2020, 2022

Conference division champions
- 2013, 2014, 2015, 2016

Uniforms
| Home | Away |

The Murray State Racers men's basketball program represents Murray State University in intercollegiate men's basketball. Murray State is a member of the Missouri Valley Conference in Division I of the National Collegiate Athletic Association (NCAA), having joined that conference in 2022 after 74 seasons in the Ohio Valley Conference. The Racers have played home games at the CFSB Center on their campus in Murray, Kentucky since 1998. Murray State made its 18th appearance in the NCAA tournament in 2022. Five times the Racers advanced in the tournament, most recently by defeating the University of San Francisco in 2022. In 1988, Murray State defeated NC State in the first round but lost to eventual national champion Kansas in the second round. In 2010, 22 years to the date of the 1988 win, the Racers beat Vanderbilt and lost to eventual runner-up Butler in the second round.

== Venues ==
Murray State's first basketball venues were Wilson Hall (1926–27); Lovett Auditorium (1928–1937), which had a capacity of 1,500; and Carr Health Building (1937–1954), which had a capacity of 3,000. Racer Arena opened in 1954 and entertained Racer fans for 43 years. While its capacity was 5,500, over 6,000 people crowded the arena on numerous occasions. Racer Arena is now a volleyball-only facility, one of the largest in NCAA Division I.

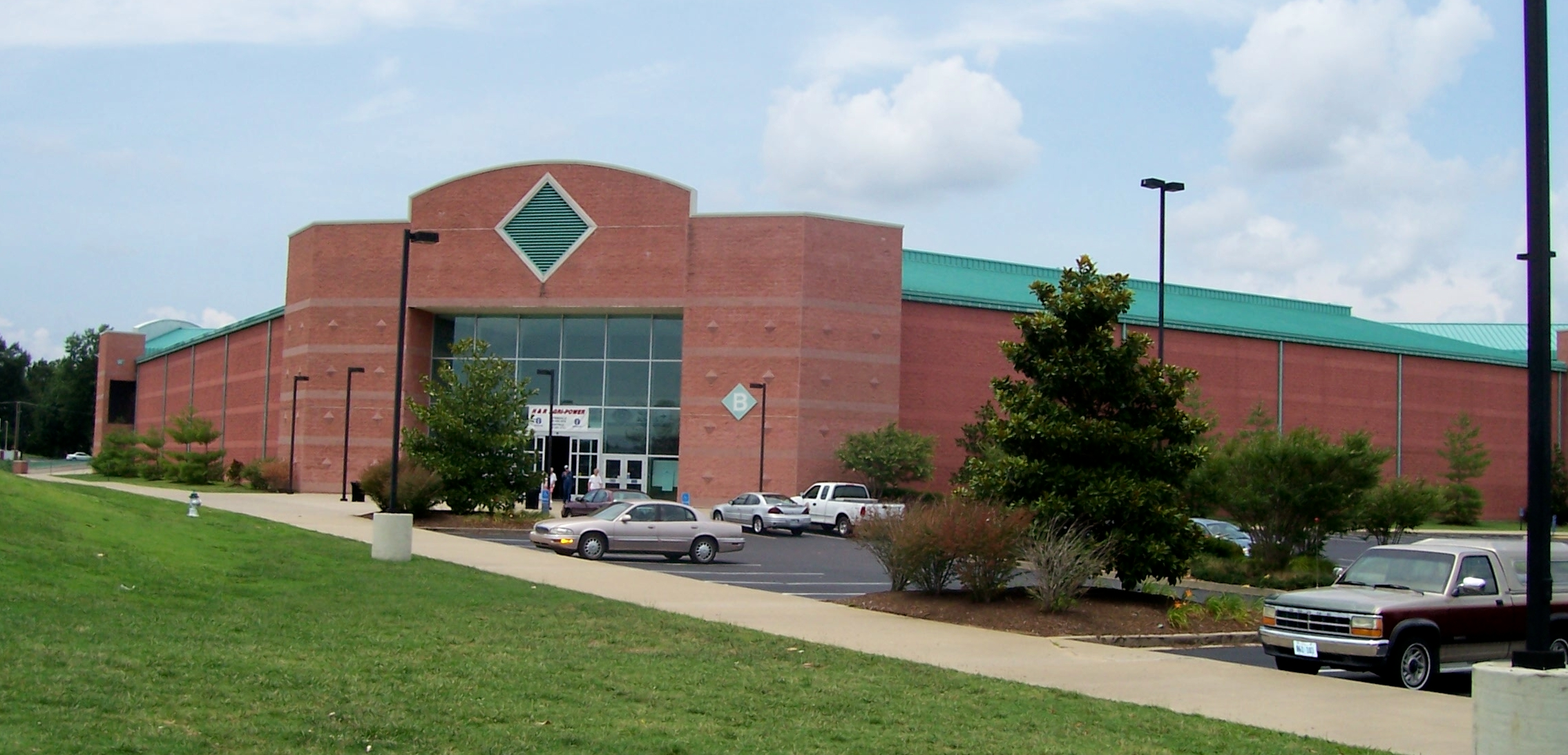
CFSB Center

Replacing Racer Arena was the CFSB Center, the current home of Murray State men's basketball. Completed in June 1998 at a cost of $20 million, the facility is a modern arena which can host other events besides basketball. The CFSB Center sits 8,602 and includes a $250,000 scoreboard and a 2,000 sq. ft. weight room. The first basketball game at the CFSB Center was against Southern Illinois on November 14, 1998, a 65–62 victory for the Racers in front of 7,633 spectators. It was formerly known as the Regional Special Events Center, or "RSEC", until the name was changed on September 17, 2010, after Community Financial Services Bank donated $3.3 million to Murray State, at the time the largest donation in athletic history.

== History ==
In 2005, Street & Smith's named the Racers the 52nd best program of all time. In their prestige system, ESPN ranked Murray State the 30th best programs from 1984 to 2008, breaking a tie with Villanova due to a higher winning percentage. The Racers are the highest "true" mid-major team in their rankings.

=== Cutchin era (1925–1941) ===
Carlisle Cutchin launched the Murray State basketball program in 1925. At the time, Murray State was a teacher's college and the nickname was the Thoroughbreds. In the 1935–36 season, Cutchin coached Murray State to its highest win percentage for a season at .920, when his Thoroughbreds finished with a record of 23–2. That season also included Murray State's best start, at 19–1. In his final season, he led the Thoroughbreds to the title game of the 1941 NAIA Division I men's basketball tournament, at which time they lost to the San Diego State Aztecs 36–34. Since he retired in 1941, he has maintained his position as the all-time winningest coach in Murray State basketball history, with a career record of 267–101.

=== Mountjoy era (1941–1942) ===
Rice Mountjoy was hired as the next men's basketball coach from Danville High School, where he was athletic director. In his only season with the Thoroughbreds, he coached the team to an 18–4 record. That season was marked by strong play from early jump shot proponent Joe Fulks, who transferred from Millsaps College. Mountjoy left after the 1941–42 season to coach Augusta Tilghman High School in nearby Paducah.

=== John Miller era (1942–1948) ===
Former Murray State basketball player and then-freshman team coach John Miller replaced Mountjoy as head basketball coach. His best season was his first, when he led the team to a 21–5 record and finished fourth in the 1941 NAIA Division I men's basketball tournament.

=== Hodges era (1948–1954) ===
From Southern Illinois, Harlan Hodges led the team to two NAIA Tournaments and two No. 16 AP rankings in his six seasons, with a 109–66 (.623) record. Bennie Purcell and Garrett Beshear were on the roster during those years and were later named NAIA All-Americans. Hodges left Murray in May 1954 for the University of Idaho in the Pacific Coast Conference, where success largely eluded him. He resigned after five seasons in 1959 to become the superintendent of schools in Anna, Illinois, then returned to Murray in 1964 to teach.

=== Alexander era (1954–1958) ===
Rex Alexander was promoted from assistant to head coach after former North Carolina head coach Tom Scott accepted, then turned down the head coaching post at Murray State. Alexander led Murray State for four seasons, posting a 45–54 record, including a 15–10 mark in 1955–56. But after his first team was Ohio Valley Conference regular-season and tournament runners-up, his teams never finished higher than third in the conference and he was replaced by DePauw University head coach Cal Luther on March 5, 1958. Alexander agreed to stay on as an assistant coach under Luther.

=== Luther era (1959–1974) ===
In 1958, Murray State hired Cal Luther, who had served the previous four seasons as head coach at DePauw. In 16 seasons under Luther, Murray State won three OVC regular-season championships and made the NCAA tournament in 1964 and 1969. His 1970–71 team reached No. 17 in the Associated Press poll, entering the rankings after a thrilling 73–71 victory over Western Kentucky in Murray. WKU would go on to reach the NCAA tournament Final Four that season. A two-time OVC Coach of the Year, Luther led the Racers to a 241–134 record.

Luther's most notable players were future professional players Dick Cunningham, Claude Virden and Stewart Johnson, as well as Racer greats Herb McPherson, Jim Jennings and Les Taylor.

Cal Luther was a firebrand of a coach. The standing joke at the university was the over and under of Cal throwing off his jacket during a game due to a call by a ref, or from frustration with a player. The latter part of his tenure was marred by an OVC issue with testing and which tests the schools in the OVC used to qualify athletes. During the 1973–74 season several players were disqualified for using an illegal testing equivalency. This happened across the OVC, and Murray was not the only school to lose student athletes. Most of the disqualified athletes were allowed to transfer by the NCAA to other schools, but OVC schools lost the services of those athletes who had not actually taken the SAT, but had taken the ACT.

=== Overton era (1975–1978) ===
After three seasons as an assistant under Cal Luther, Fred Overton was elevated to head coach in 1975. After a 9–17 first season, the Racers started the 1976–77 season with a 17–6 record before dropping their last four games for a 17–10 final ledger, finishing second in the OVC. But after the Racers posted an 8–17 in 1977–78, Overton was fired.

=== Greene era (1978–1985) ===
Ron Greene returned to his alma mater fresh off earning the AP Southeastern Conference Coach of the Year award at Mississippi State in 1978.

After managing only four wins in his first season as coach at Murray, Greene led the Racers to 23 wins the following year and an appearance in the National Invitation Tournament. The Racers knocked off Jacksonville and Alabama before losing to Illinois 65–63 in the quarterfinals, all on the road. Greene's Racers would win three Ohio Valley Conference regular-season titles and reach the NIT twice more under his guidance.

A highlight of the 1981–82 season came when Murray State traveled to South Bend, Indiana, to play against Notre Dame. Murray State defeated a Notre Dame team coached by Digger Phelps 56–54.

His overall record at Murray State was 119–78. While at the Racer helm, Greene coached Racer greats Gary Hooker and Lamont Sleets.

=== Newton era (1985–1991) ===
In Steve Newton's second season, in 1986–87 the team finished with a 13–15 record. This marked the last time the Racers had a losing season for the next 29 seasons; only Arizona, Kansas, and Syracuse hold longer streaks.

In addition to Murray's win in 1988, two years later the No. 16 seed Racers took No. 1 seed Michigan State into overtime before falling 75–71. The loss in 1990 was the closest a 16 seeded team had ever come to knocking off a No. 1 seeded team in the tournament. While a 16 seeded Princeton team and a 16 seeded East Tennessee State team both fell by just 1 point during regulation in the 1989 tournament, the 1990 Murray State team was the only 16 seed ever to take a game into overtime. In 1997, the No. 15 seed Racers nearly shocked the No. 2 seed Duke Blue Devils in a 71–68 loss.

In 1988, Jeff Martin became the first basketball player in Murray State, and OVC, history to be invited to the Olympic trials for the US Basketball Team. This was the last year that professionals were not allowed on the team. Martin did not make the team but impressed many with his performance.

The best-known player in the Newton era is Popeye Jones. While at Murray State, Jones scored 2,057 points which still ranks fourth all time for the Racers. He is also Murray State's all-time leader in rebounds with 1,374, and led the nation in that category in the 1990–91 season. Jones is the only player in MSU history to record more than 2,000 points and 1,000 rebounds. Jones helped lead the Racers to OVC championships in 1991 and 1992. He went on to have a successful career in the NBA after being drafted in the second round by the Houston Rockets in the 1992 NBA Draft.

=== Edgar era (1992–1995) ===
Scott Edgar was hired as head basketball coach after serving six seasons as an assistant coach under Nolan Richardson at Arkansas. Bringing a version of Richardson's uptempo "40 Minutes of Hell" philosophy to Murray, Edgar led the Racers to two NCAA tournament appearances (1992, 1995) and one NIT appearance (1994) in four seasons. His teams won three OVC regular-season championships (1992, 1994 and 1995), posting a 48–14 record in conference games during his tenure.

Edgar recruited Racer greats Marcus Brown and Vincent Rainey to Murray State, with Brown averaging 22.4 points and Rainey 18.8 points in Edgar's final season at Murray.

Edgar left Murray State after the 1994–95 season to become head coach at Duquesne.

=== Gottfried era (1995–1998) ===
Mark Gottfried was hired as head basketball coach after serving seven seasons as an assistant coach under Jim Harrick at UCLA. Gottfried was hired shortly after he finished the 1995 season with the Bruins, in which he helped lead the Bruins to an NCAA Men's Division I Basketball Championship. Mark Gottfried was also the nephew of ESPN analyst and former Murray State football coach Mike Gottfried.

In Gottfried's first season, the Racers returned four starters, including Marcus Brown, from the Racer team that nearly upset North Carolina in the 1995 NCAA tournament, and the team was picked to finished first in the OVC. The Racers won the Ohio Valley Conference regular season championship in 1996 for the third straight season; however, the Racers were defeated in the OVC tournament. In the final game of the tournament, Murray State's Vincent Rainey was charged with a foul with two-tenths of a second left on the clock in a tie game against the rival Austin Peay Governors. APSU's Reggie Crenshaw made two free throws and the Racers lost the game 70–68. As a result of the loss, the Racers did not reach the 1996 NCAA tournament. The Racers lost to the Missouri Tigers in the opening round of the 1996 National Invitational Tournament, and finished the season 19–10. Marcus Brown finished his college playing career at the close of the 1996 season with 2,236 career points, which is third best in Murray State history.

With a November 23, 1996, victory over the Belmont Bruins, the Racers began a 47-game home winning streak that would last into the 1999–2000 season. The Racers won the 1997 OVC Tournament with an overtime win over Austin Peay and earned a spot in the NCAA tournament.

ESPN's College Basketball Encyclopedia names the Racers 1997–98 season as having the best team in school history. OVC player of the year De'Teri Mayes led the 1997–98 team to 23 victories by double digit margins. Isaac Spencer was a freshman on the team. Spencer would go on to score 2,248 points over four seasons, which places him second place all time for the Racers. The Racers won both the OVC regular season and OVC tournament again in 1998; however, Murray State fell to number eight seed Rhode Island in the first round of the NCAA tournament. The Racers finished the season a number 25 ranking in the final AP Poll. Mark Gottfried won three Ohio Valley Conference Championships in each of his three seasons, the only OVC coach to accomplish such a mark.

Gottfried was hired by Alabama to be head basketball coach in March 1998. He had been a starting player for the Crimson Tide for three seasons between 1985 and 1987.

=== Anderson era (1998–2003) ===
Tevester Anderson was promoted to head coach of the Racers in March, 1998 after Mark Gottfried left Murray State to take the head coach position at the University of Alabama. Anderson, the first African American to serve as head coach of the Murray State men's basketball team, had previously served as an assistant coach under Gottfried during the previous three seasons. At age 61, Anderson was also the oldest rookie head coach in NCAA Division I basketball. In his first year as coach of the Racers, Anderson led the team to a 27–6 record, an Ohio Valley Conference championship, and an NCAA tournament appearance. Anderson was named the OVC's Co-Coach of the Year and was named NABC District 7 Coach of the Year following the 1998–99 season.

In Anderson's second year as head coach, the Racers finished the 1999–2000 season with a 23–9 record. The record was good enough to capture a share of the OVC regular season championship, but the Racer's failed to win the OVC Tournament and earn a spot in the NCAA tournament. Murray State home court winning streak, the longest in the nation, also came to an end in 2000 with a January 15 loss to Southeast Missouri State University.

Over the next three years under Anderson, the success of the Racer basketball program steadily declined, culminating in a low point during the 2002–03 season. The Racers finished the 2002–03 season with a 17–12 record, which was fourth-place in the OVC standings. The fourth-place finish was the worst finish in the OVC standings since the 1986–87 season. Amid rumors that Anderson would relinquish his coaching duties at Murray State under pressure from university officials, he resigned from the head coach position in March 2003. Anderson was named as the new head coach at Jackson State University in April 2003.

=== Cronin era (2003–2006) ===
Previously an assistant at Cincinnati (1997–2001) under Bob Huggins and at Louisville (2001–03) under Rick Pitino, Mick Cronin was introduced as the new head coach of the Racers on April 5, 2003. When he accepted the position, Cronin became the fourth youngest head coach in NCAA Division-I basketball. In Cronin's first season as head coach, the Racers won the OVC tournament and advanced to the first round of the NCAA tournament where the Racers fell to No. 5 seeded Illinois. The success of the 2003–04 season was also tainted by arrests and suspensions. Just before the start of the 2004 NCAA tournament, juniors Adam Chiles and Kelvin Brown were arrested on drug charges. Chiles was charged with hindering prosecution and possession of marijuana and drug paraphernalia, and Brown was charged with theft from an alleged gas drive-off, possession of marijuana, and his second offense of possession of drug paraphernalia. Both were arrested following a 911 hangup call from their apartment in which Chiles was found outside and Brown was found hiding in a closet. Chiles was cleared to play in the tournament, but Brown was suspended indefinitely and later dismissed from the team in April.

Problems continued for the Racers in the 2004–05 season. The team's only returning starter, Adam Chiles, was dismissed from the team in November following his second arrest of 2004. Chiles was stopped by Kentucky State Police while driving on Western Kentucky Parkway near Leitchfield, Kentucky. Chiles was charged with driving under the influence, possession of marijuana, possession of an open alcoholic beverage container, and speeding. Chiles had averaged 10.1 points and 3.9 assists for the Racers in the previous season. The Racers went on to finish the 2004–05 season with a record of 20–10 and a first round loss in the OVC tournament.

The 2005–06 Racers rebounded from their struggles in the previous season to win both the OVC regular season title, their 1st since 2000, and the tournament title to return to the NCAA. In the 2006 tournament, junior guard Trey Pearson missed a critical 3-point shot in the final seconds of the first-round game against No. 3 seeded defending champion North Carolina. UNC was fouled on the rebound and went to the line to sink the game clinching shots to defeat the No. 14 seeded Racers 69–65. After the 2006 NCAA tournament Cronin took the reins of the Cincinnati Bearcats, his hometown team and alma mater.

=== Kennedy era (2006–2011) ===
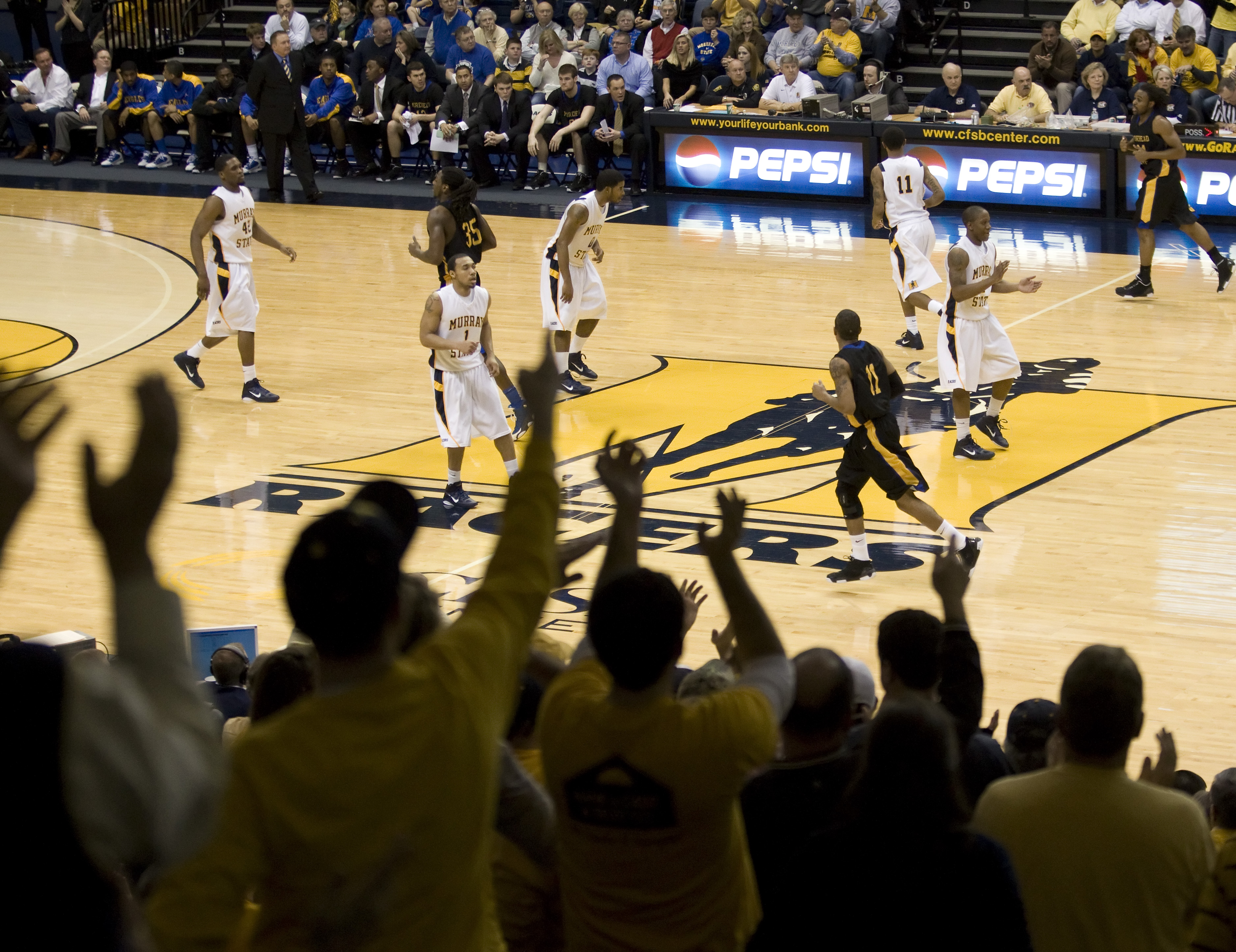
A Murray State basketball game in 2011.

On April 12, 2006, Southeastern Louisiana head coach Billy Kennedy was introduced as Murray State University's head men's basketball coach, succeeding the recently departed Cronin.

After continuing to contend in the conference over his first few seasons, Kennedy's 2009–10 team finally broke through, winning the program's 21st OVC regular season title with a conference record of 17–1. They would then go on to defeat Morehead State to capture their 14th OVC tournament title, clinching a berth in the NCAA tournament.

The Racers won their first-round game in the 2010 NCAA tournament in dramatic fashion, defeating fourth-seeded Vanderbilt 66–65 on a buzzer-beating jump shot by senior Danero Thomas. This was the first time that any Ohio Valley Conference team had advanced to the 2nd round of the NCAA tournament since Middle Tennessee advanced in 1989.

The Racers followed up a regular season conference championship for the second year in a row in 2011. The Racers were eliminated from the OVC tournament in 2011; however, they earned a number six seed in the National Invitational Tournament where the Racers suffered a first round loss to Missouri State University. In May 2011, Billy Kennedy announced that he was leaving Murray State to accept the head coach position at Texas A&M University.

=== First Prohm era (2011–2015) ===
Steve Prohm was introduced as the 15th head coach on May 23, 2011. Prohm was promoted to the head coach position after serving as an assistant coach under Billy Kennedy for the previous five seasons. The Racers won the 2011 Great Alaska Shootout early in the 2011–12 season and went on a 23-game winning streak to start the season. The team's 23–0 start under Prohm was the best start to a season in team history. The 23–0 start beat the previous best start record of 16–0 set by the 1935–36 men's basketball team under Carlisle Cutchin. The 23–0 start was the third-best start in NCAA Division I history for a first-year head coach, and it set OVC records for most wins to start a season and overall winning streak during a season

The 10th win of the 2011–12 season was a victory over the then No. 21-ranked Memphis Tigers. This was Murray State's first win over a ranked team since defeating Vanderbilt in the 2010 NCAA tournament. It was also Murray State's first win over a ranked team during the regular season since the Racers defeated No. 12 Arkansas in 1997. Following the victory over Memphis, the Racers entered the national polls at No. 24 on the AP Top 25 Poll on December 12, 2011. This marked the first time an OVC basketball team had been ranked in the major national polls since the Racers were last ranked at No. 25 in the final poll of the 1998 season. The No. 24 ranking also marked the team's highest ranking since February 1971, when the Racers were 17th. The No. 24-ranked Racers defeated the Lipscomb Bisons in the 11th game of the season. The victory was the first win for Murray State as a ranked team since a ranked Racer team defeated Tennessee Tech 72–69 on February 2, 1971. On January 2, 2012, Murray State moved into the No. 1 spot in the CollegeInsider.com Mid-Major Top 25 Poll. The Racers became the first OVC team to ever achieve the No. 1 ranking in the Mid-Major Top 25 Poll. Following Murray State's 16th win of the season, a January 7, 2012, victory over conference-rival Austin Peay, the Racers moved up to No. 14 in the USA Today/ESPN Coaches' Poll and No. 15 in the AP Poll. Their 17th win came against Jacksonville State at the CFSB center to put the Racers to 17–0, and their best start in school history. Their 18th win against Tennessee Tech, 82–74 on January 14, 2012, kept Murray one of only three Division I schools with an unbeaten season as of that date. The January 9 AP ranking was the highest ranking in the history of the Murray State men's basketball program. The No. 15 ranking was also the highest ranking for an OVC team since the Western Kentucky Hilltoppers were ranked No. 7 on March 16, 1971.

On February 9, 2012, Murray State hosted OVC-rival Tennessee State University as the No. 9 team in the nation and the lone unbeaten in Division I basketball. Murray State lost 72–68. Two days later, Murray State answered with a definitive win at home against rival Austin Peay 82–63, bringing its record to 24–1. This win was quickly followed by a win on the road at SEMO, 75–66, to clinch the Racers third consecutive Ohio Valley Conference regular-season championship.

On February 18, Murray State hosted St. Mary's College in a much-anticipated Bracketbuster event, and the last home game of the season. The game was not only a sellout, but the largest ever for attendance at the CFSB center: 8,825. This marked the first time two ranked teams played at the CFSB Center (Murray State No. 16 AP, No. 14 USA Today/ESPN; St. Mary's No. 21 AP, No. 16 USA Today/ESPN) and the first time a ranked Murray State team played another ranked team. The game also featured a national TV audience on ESPN with legendary announcers Dave O'Brien and Dick Vitale calling the action. Murray State never trailed in the game and defeated St. Mary's 65–51, improving its record to 26–1. As the historic 2011–12 season came to a close, the Murray State men's basketball program was the recipient of several high-profile awards. Coach Steve Prohm was named the Ohio Valley Conference Coach of the Year, which marked the third-consecutive year the award was presented to a Murray State head coach. Prohm also was recognized as the District-IV Coach of the Year by the United States Basketball Writers Association and District 19 Coach of the Year by the National Association of Basketball Coaches. Prohm also received two national coach of the year awards: the Basketball Times Coach of the Year Award and the Joe B. Hall National Coach of the Year Award. Junior point guard Isaiah Canaan was named OVC Player of the Year and Second Team All-America by the Associated Press, as well as selected to the John R. Wooden All-American team, Lute Olson All-America team, NABC All-America Third Team, and Sporting News All-America First Team. Canaan was a finalist for the John R. Wooden Award, Bob Cousy Award, Oscar Robertson Trophy, Lou Henson Award and to the Naismith College Player of the Year Midseason watch list.

On June 8, 2015, Prohm was announced as the new head coach at Iowa State. The Iowa State job had become open when Fred Hoiberg left to become head coach of the Chicago Bulls.

=== McMahon era (2015–2022) ===
On June 10, 2015, Matt McMahon was hired as head coach of Murray State. McMahon served as an assistant under Prohm and had just left the school to serve as an assistant to Eric Konkol at Louisiana Tech on May 27, 2015, before Prohm left for Iowa State. "I am so excited to know that Coach McMahon will be returning to Murray State to lead the Racers," Murray State athletic director Allen Ward said. "After watching him for four years, I'm convinced he's the right man for the job. He's an outstanding coach, nationally recognized as one of the top assistants in the country, with a tremendous upside. Matt has the talent and integrity to continue the momentum we've built, put his own stamp on the program, and meet the expectations that come with being the head coach at Murray State."

In his first season as head coach, the Racers finished the season 17–14, 10–6 in OVC play to finish in a tie for the West Division title. They lost in the quarterfinals of the OVC tournament. However, the following year, the team's record dipped as they finished 16–17, 8–8 in OVC play to finish in third place in the West Division and losing in the semifinals of the OVC tournament.

McMahon's third Racer team posted a 26–6, 16–2 record, winning the OVC regular season and tournament championships. They were received a 12 seed in the 2018 NCAA tournament, where they fell in the first round to West Virginia. After the season, he was named National Association of Basketball Coaches District 19 Coach of the Year.

In June 2018, Murray State awarded McMahon a contract extension through 2022.

The 2018–19 season saw the Racers win 15 of their first 17 games, with the only losses to Southeastern Conference opponents Alabama and eventual Final Four participant Auburn, both on the road. By then, the nation had been introduced to sophomore point guard Ja Morant, who scored 25 points against Auburn and 38 against Alabama. The Racers went on to post a 16–2 OVC record and won the conference tournament championship over Belmont, 77–65, in Evansville, Indiana, earning a bid to the NCAA tournament for the 17th time. There, the Racers earned a No. 12 seed and defeated Marquette of the Big East Conference, 83–64, in Hartford, Connecticut, on March 21 behind a triple-double from Morant (17 points, 11 rebounds, 16 assists). Two days later, Murray State fell to No. 4 seed Florida State of the Atlantic Coast Conference, 90–62, finishing the season with a 28–5 record. After the season, Morant was named a consensus First Team All-American after becoming the first player in NCAA history to average at least 20 points and 10 assists per game (24.5 ppg, 10 apg).

The 2019–20 season saw the Racers go 22–8 in the regular season and finish tied with Belmont atop the OVC standings with a record of 15–3. Murray State earned a share of its third straight regular season OVC Championship, while Belmont earned the No. 1 seed due to a tie-breaker (having a better record against EIU than the Racers did). Sophomores Tevin Brown and KJ Williams were named to the All-OVC First Team prior to entering the 2020 OVC Tournament. The Racers and Belmont squared off in the OVC Championship finale for the third time in the last three years. Murray State won the previous two years but fell this season, 76–75. There was no postseason play forthcoming for the Racers—or anyone else in college basketball—due to the shutdown of spectator sports due to the COVID-19 pandemic that engulfed the world in 2020.

The Racers' final OVC season in 2021–22 saw the Racers go on an unprecedented run rarely seen in the program's history. Initially picked to finish 3rd in the conference, the Racers compiled a perfect 18–0 record in conference play, winning the regular season title for the 28th time in program history. During this stretch, the Racers would enter the Top 25 rankings for the first time since the 2014–15 season, reaching as high as No. 19. In addition, Brown would break the OVC record for most 3-point field goals made in a career. They would then go on to win both of their OVC tournament games; a dominant semi-final victory over SEMO and a back-and-forth thriller against defending tournament champion Morehead State in the championship game, to secure the program's 18th OVC tournament championship and an automatic bid to the NCAA tournament. Individually, Brown and Williams were once again named to the All-OVC First Team, being joined by sophomore Justice Hill. Williams was named OVC Player of the Year, while Hill was named the OVC tournament's Most Valuable Player. McMahon himself was named the OVC Coach of the year for his efforts. Earning a No. 7 seed, they defeated San Francisco in the first round of the NCAA tournament before a surprise loss to Saint Peter's in the second round. Two days after Murray's exit from the NCAA tournament, McMahon left to take the head coaching opening at LSU.

=== Second Prohm era (2022–2025) ===
On March 25, 2022, it was announced that Steve Prohm would return to the university as head coach. "As we envisioned the ideal profile for the next Murray State Men's Basketball head coach, it remained abundantly clear a commitment to character, integrity, student-athlete development, community, family and competitive excellence were critically important," said Murray State Director of Athletics, Kevin Saal. "Steve Prohm represents, reflects and personifies these, and many more, qualities. His skill set, experience and genuine love for Murray State will effectively guide our program as we begin our Missouri Valley Conference journey."

On March 7, 2025, after a loss in the Missouri Valley Conference Tournament quarterfinals, it was reported by ESPN that Murray State had parted ways with Prohm after a 45–52 record in three seasons as head coach. The university confirmed the decision the following day.

== Season-by-season results ==
Starting from the 1987–88 season, the Racers had recorded a winning season for 29 straight years ending in the 2016–17 season. They have won 20 or more games in a season 32 times and three times have won 30 or more. For the first time in school history, the 2014–15 Racers went undefeated (16–0) in the OVC regular season. In their final OVC season in 2021–22, they posted an unprecedented 18–0 OVC regular-season record.

Record table
| Season | Team | Overall | Conference | Standing | Postseason |
|---|---|---|---|---|---|
Carlisle Cutchin (MsVC) (1925–1930)
| 1925–26 | Murray State Racers | 9–5 | | | |
| 1926–27 | Murray State Racers | 11–9 | | | |
| 1927–28 | Murray State Racers | 8–9 | | | |
| 1928–29 | Murray State Racers | 12–8 | | | |
| 1929–30 | Murray State Racers | 19–2 | | 1st MsVC | |
Carlisle Cutchin (KIAC & SIAA) (1930–1941)
| 1930–31 | Murray State Racers | 12–6 | | | |
| 1931–32 | Murray State Racers | 17–3 | | | |
| 1932–33 | Murray State Racers | 14–6 | | | |
| 1933–34 | Murray State Racers | 11–6 | | | |
| 1934–35 | Murray State Racers | 18–6 | | | |
| 1935–36 | Murray State Racers | 23–2 | | 1st SIAA | |
| 1936–37 | Murray State Racers | 22–3 | | | |
| 1937–38 | Murray State Racers | 27–4 | | | NAIA Final Four, 3rd |
| 1938–39 | Murray State Racers | 13–8 | | | NAIA 2nd Round |
| 1939–40 | Murray State Racers | 14–9 | | | |
| 1940–41 | Murray State Racers | 26–5 | | 1st KIAC | NAIA Runner–up |
| Carlisle Cutchin: | | 256–90 | | | |
Rice Mountjoy (KIAC & SIAA) (1941–1942)
| 1941–42 | Murray State Racers | 18–4 | | | NAIA 1st Round |
| Rice Mountjoy: | | 18–4 | | | |
John Miller (KIAC) (1943–1948)
| 1942–43 | Murray State Racers | 21–5 | | | NAIA Final Four, 4th |
| 1943–44 | Murray State Racers | 5–9 | | | |
| 1944–45 | Murray State Racers | 12–10 | | | |
| 1945–46 | Murray State Racers | 10–13 | | | |
| 1946–47 | Murray State Racers | 14–11 | | | |
John Miller & Carlisle Cutchin (KIAC) (1947–1948)
| 1947–48 | Murray State Racers | 12–12 | | | |
| John Miller: | | 63–50 | | | |
| Carlisle Cutchin: | | 11–10 | | | |
| Carlisle Cutchin Total: | | 267–101 | | | |
Harlan Hodges (Ohio Valley Conference) (1948–1954)
| 1948–49 | Murray State Racers | 13–12 | 3–9 | 6th | |
| 1949–50 | Murray State Racers | 18–13 | 5–7 | 5th | NAIA 1st Round |
| 1950–51 | Murray State Racers | 21–6 | 9–3 | 1st | |
| 1951–52 | Murray State Racers | 24–10 | 9–3 | 3rd | NAIA Runner–up |
| 1952–53 | Murray State Racers | 18–9 | 7–3 | 3rd | |
| 1953–54 | Murray State Racers | 15–16 | 6–4 | 2nd | |
| Harlan Hodges: | | 109–66 | 39–29 | | |
Rex Alexander (Ohio Valley Conference) (1954–1958)
| 1954–55 | Murray State Racers | 11–15 | 6–4 | 2nd | |
| 1955–56 | Murray State Racers | 15–10 | 6–4 | 4th | |
| 1956–57 | Murray State Racers | 11–13 | 5–5 | 3rd | |
| 1957–58 | Murray State Racers | 8–16 | 6–6 | 4th | |
| Rex Alexander: | | 45–54 | 23–19 | | |
Cal Luther (Ohio Valley Conference) (1958–1974)
| 1958–59 | Murray State Racers | 10–15 | 3–9 | 7th | |
| 1959–60 | Murray State Racers | 12–11 | 7–4 | 3rd | |
| 1960–61 | Murray State Racers | 13–10 | 7–5 | 4th | |
| 1961–62 | Murray State Racers | 13–12 | 5–7 | 5th | |
| 1962–63 | Murray State Racers | 13–9 | 6–6 | 4th | |
| 1963–64 | Murray State Racers | 16–9 | 11–3 | 1st | NCAA round of 25 |
| 1964–65 | Murray State Racers | 19–7 | 9–5 | 3rd | |
| 1965–66 | Murray State Racers | 13–12 | 8–6 | 3rd | |
| 1966–67 | Murray State Racers | 14–9 | 8–6 | 2nd | |
| 1967–68 | Murray State Racers | 16–8 | 10–4 | T–1st | |
| 1968–69 | Murray State Racers | 22–6 | 11–3 | T–1st | NCAA round of 25 |
| 1969–70 | Murray State Racers | 17–9 | 9–5 | 2nd | |
| 1970–71 | Murray State Racers | 19–5 | 10–4 | 2nd | |
| 1971–72 | Murray State Racers | 15–11 | 6–8 | 5th | |
| 1972–73 | Murray State Racers | 17–8 | 9–5 | 2nd | |
| 1973–74 | Murray State Racers | 12–13 | 6–8 | 5th | |
| 1974–75 | Murray State Racers | 10–15 | 3–11 | 7th | |
| Cal Luther: | | 241–154 | 125–88 | | |
Fred Overton (Ohio Valley Conference) (1975–1978)
| 1975–76 | Murray State Racers | 9–17 | 5–9 | 7th | |
| 1976–77 | Murray State Racers | 17–10 | 9–5 | 2nd | |
| 1977–78 | Murray State Racers | 8–17 | 4–10 | 7th | |
| Fred Overton: | | 44–59 | 21–25 | | |
Ron Greene (Ohio Valley Conference) (1978–1985)
| 1978–79 | Murray State Racers | 4–22 | 2–10 | 7th | |
| 1979–80 | Murray State Racers | 23–8 | 10–2 | T–1st | NIT Quarterfinals |
| 1980–81 | Murray State Racers | 17–10 | 10–4 | 2nd | |
| 1981–82 | Murray State Racers | 20–8 | 13–3 | T–1st | NIT first round |
| 1982–83 | Murray State Racers | 21–8 | 11–3 | 1st | NIT first round |
| 1983–84 | Murray State Racers | 15–13 | 7–7 | 4th | |
| 1984–85 | Murray State Racers | 19–9 | 8–6 | 4th | |
| Ron Greene: | | 119–78 | 63–35 | | |
Steve Newton (Ohio Valley Conference) (1985–1991)
| 1985–86 | Murray State Racers | 17–12 | 8–6 | 3rd | |
| 1986–87 | Murray State Racers | 13–15 | 6–8 | 6th | |
| 1987–88 | Murray State Racers | 22–9 | 13–1 | 1st | NCAA round of 32 |
| 1988–89 | Murray State Racers | 19–11 | 10–2 | T–1st | NIT first round |
| 1989–90 | Murray State Racers | 21–9 | 10–2 | 1st | NCAA round of 64 |
| 1990–91 | Murray State Racers | 24–9 | 10–2 | 1st | NCAA round of 64 |
| Steve Newton: | | 116–65 | 57–21 | | |
Scott Edgar (Ohio Valley Conference) (1991–1995)
| 1991–92 | Murray State Racers | 17–13 | 11–3 | 1st | NCAA round of 64 |
| 1992–93 | Murray State Racers | 18–12 | 11–5 | 2nd | |
| 1993–94 | Murray State Racers | 23–6 | 15–1 | 1st | NIT first round |
| 1994–95 | Murray State Racers | 21–9 | 11–5 | T–1st | NCAA round of 64 |
| Scott Edgar: | | 79–40 | 48–14 | | |
Mark Gottfried (Ohio Valley Conference) (1995–1998)
| 1995–96 | Murray State Racers | 19–10 | 12–4 | 1st | NIT first round |
| 1996–97 | Murray State Racers | 20–10 | 12–6 | T–1st | NCAA round of 64 |
| 1997–98 | Murray State Racers | 29–4 | 16–2 | 1st | NCAA round of 64 |
| Mark Gottfried: | | 68–24 | 40–12 | | |
Tevester Anderson (Ohio Valley Conference) (1998–2003)
| 1998–99 | Murray State Racers | 27–6 | 16–2 | 1st | NCAA round of 64 |
| 1999–00 | Murray State Racers | 23–9 | 14–4 | T–1st | |
| 2000–01 | Murray State Racers | 17–12 | 11–5 | 2nd | |
| 2001–02 | Murray State Racers | 19–13 | 10–6 | 3rd | NCAA round of 64 |
| 2002–03 | Murray State Racers | 17–12 | 9–7 | 4th | |
| Tevester Anderson: | | 103–52 | 50–24 | | |
Mick Cronin (Ohio Valley Conference) (2003–2006)
| 2003–04 | Murray State Racers | 28–6 | 14–2 | 2nd | NCAA round of 64 |
| 2004–05 | Murray State Racers | 17–11 | 11–5 | 2nd | |
| 2005–06 | Murray State Racers | 27–4 | 17–3 | 1st | NCAA round of 64 |
| Mick Cronin: | | 69–24 | 42–10 | | |
Billy Kennedy (Ohio Valley Conference) (2006–2011)
| 2006–07 | Murray State Racers | 16–14 | 13–7 | 2nd | |
| 2007–08 | Murray State Racers | 18–13 | 13–7 | 2nd | |
| 2008–09 | Murray State Racers | 19–12 | 13–5 | 2nd | |
| 2009–10 | Murray State Racers | 31–5 | 17–1 | 1st | NCAA round of 32 |
| 2010–11 | Murray State Racers | 23–9 | 14–4 | 1st | NIT first round |
| Billy Kennedy: | | 107–53 | 70–24 | | |
Steve Prohm (Ohio Valley Conference) (2011–2015)
| 2011–12 | Murray State Racers | 31–2 | 15–1 | 1st | NCAA round of 32 |
| 2012–13 | Murray State Racers | 21–10 | 10–6 | 1st West | |
| 2013–14 | Murray State Racers | 23–11 | 13–3 | 1st West | CIT champions |
| 2014–15 | Murray State Racers | 29–6 | 16–0 | 1st West | NIT Quarterfinals |
| Steve Prohm: | | 104–29 | 54–10 | | |
Matt McMahon (Ohio Valley Conference) (2015–2022)
| 2015–16 | Murray State Racers | 17–14 | 10–6 | T–1st West | |
| 2016–17 | Murray State Racers | 16–17 | 8–8 | 3rd West | |
| 2017–18 | Murray State Racers | 26–6 | 16–2 | 1st | NCAA round of 64 |
| 2018–19 | Murray State Racers | 28–5 | 16–2 | T–1st | NCAA round of 32 |
| 2019–20 | Murray State Racers | 23–9 | 15–3 | T–1st | |
| 2020–21 | Murray State Racers | 13–13 | 10–10 | T–5th | |
| 2021–22 | Murray State Racers | 31–3 | 18–0 | 1st | NCAA round of 32 |
| Matt McMahon: | | 154–67 | 93–31 | | |
Steve Prohm (Missouri Valley Conference) (2022–2025)
| 2022–23 | Murray State Racers | 17–15 | 11–9 | 7th | |
| 2023–24 | Murray State Racers | 12–20 | 9–11 | T-7th | |
| 2023–24 | Murray State Racers | 16–17 | 9–11 | 7th | |
| Steve Prohm: | | 45-52 | 29-31 | | |
| Total: | | 1,734–957 | 750–376 | | |
National champion Postseason invitational champion Conference regular season champion Conference regular season and conference tournament champion Division regular season champion Division regular season and conference tournament champion Conference tournament champion

MsVC – Mississippi Valley Conference
KIAC – Kentucky Intercollegiate Athletic Conference (now known as River States Conference)
SIAA – Southern Intercollegiate Athletic Association
NAIB – National Association for Intercollegiate Basketball
NAIA – National Association of Intercollegiate Athletics (Was the NAIB until 1952, when it started sponsoring other sports)
NIT – National Invitation Tournament
NCAA – National Collegiate Athletic Association
CIT – CollegeInsider.com Postseason Tournament

=== Rankings ===
The Racers have been nationally ranked in eight seasons in either the Associated Press (AP) Poll or the ESPN-USA Today (Coaches) Poll. They were first ranked during the 1950–51 season coached by Harlan Hodges. The Racers received their highest ranking, under coach Steve Prohm, during the 2011–12 season, ranking 9th in the AP Poll and 7th in the Coaches Poll.

| Year | AP Poll | Coaches Poll | Coach |
| 1950–51 | 16 | | Harlan Hodges |
| 1951–52 | 16 | | Harlan Hodges |
| 1952–53 | 17 | | Harlan Hodges |
| 1970–71 | 17 | | Cal Luther |
| 1997–98 | 25 | | Mark Gottfried |
| 2011–12 | 9 | 7 | Steve Prohm |
| 2014–15 | 25 | 24 | Steve Prohm |
| 2021–22 | 19 | 19 | Matt McMahon |

- The AP Poll and Coaches Poll rankings represent the highest rankings received during that season.

== Rivalries ==
=== Western Kentucky University ===
Murray State's oldest basketball rivalry is with nearby Western Kentucky (WKU). The two teams became archrivals during their time together in the Ohio Valley Conference. Although the schools no longer share their conference affiliation (Western Kentucky joined the Sun Belt Conference in 1982 and Conference USA in 2014), the two schools keep the series alive every few years. The teams last played each other in 2014. They are set to renew their rivalry beginning in 2023 as part of a 4-game annual series. The two teams have met in basketball 147 times, with WKU leading the all-time series 95 to 56.

=== Austin Peay State University (Battle of the Border) ===
For the rest of the Racers' OVC tenure, their primary in-conference rivalry was with Austin Peay State University, a school closer geographically than WKU. In February 2009, ESPN The Magazine highlighted the Austin Peay-Murray State rivalry. The men's basketball rivalry is part of the larger athletics rivalry between the two schools known as the Battle of the Border. While the schools no longer share their conference affiliation (both left the OVC in 2022, with Austin Peay joining the ASUN and Murray State joining the MVC), both teams have kept the series going. The two teams have met 135 times, with MSU leading the all-time series 90 to 45.

=== Belmont University ===
Recently, the Racers have been building a rivalry with Belmont University since the Bruins' entry into the OVC in 2012. From that year until both teams' departure from the OVC in 2022, Belmont and Murray State combined to win every regular season championship, including two seasons (2018–19 and 2019–20) where they shared the title. In three consecutive years (from 2018 to 2020), the Racers and Bruins met in the OVC Tournament finals, with Murray State winning in 2018 and 2019. With Belmont joining the MVC alongside Murray State, the rivalry will continue in that conference. The Bruins currently lead the all-time series 13 to 12.

Murray has two more built-in regional rivals in the MVC, with Southern Illinois about two hours' drive away and Evansville slightly farther away (and also located in a county whose residents pay Kentucky in-state tuition at Murray State).

== Coaches ==
The Racers have had 17 different head coaches in their history. Carlisle Cutchin has the most wins in school history with 267. Steve Newton has won the most OVC Regular Season titles with four. Newton and Matt McMahon share the most OVC Tournament titles with three apiece. Eleven different coaches have received the OVC Coach of the Year award for a combined 17 times.

| Coach | Years (Total) | Overall Record (Pct.) | Conference Record (Pct.) | 20-Win Seasons (Best) | Notes |
| Carlisle Cutchin | 1925–1941, 1948 (17) | 267–101 (.725) | | 4 (27) | |
| Rice Mountjoy | 1941–1942 (1) | 18–4 (.818) | | 0 (18) | |
| John Miller | 1943–1948 (6) | 63–50 (.556) | | 1 (21) | |
| Harlan Hodges | 1948–1954 (6) | 109–66 (.623) | 39–29 (.574) | 2 (24) | 1951 OVC Regular Season Champions; 1951 OVC Tournament Champions |
| Rex Alexander | 1955–1958 (4) | 45–54 (.455) | 23–19 (.548) | 0 (15) | |
| Cal Luther | 1959–1974 (16) | 241–154 (.610) | 125–88 (.586) | 1 (22) | 1964, 1968, 1969 OVC Regular Season Champions; 1964 OVC Tournament Champions; 1964 & 1969 OVC Coach Of The Year |
| Fred Overton | 1975–1978 (4) | 44–59 (.427) | 21–25 (.456) | 0 (17) | 1977 OVC Coach Of The Year |
| Ron Greene | 1978–1985 (7) | 119–78 (.604) | 63–35 (.642) | 3 (23) | 1980, 1982, 1983 OVC Regular Season Champions; 1980 & 1983 OVC Coach Of The Year |
| Steve Newton | 1985–1991 (6) | 116–65 (.640) | 57–21 (.730) | 3 (24) | 1988, 1989, 1990, 1991 OVC Regular Season Champions; 1988, 1990, 1991 OVC Tournament Champions; 1988 & 1990 OVC Coach Of The Year |
| Scott Edgar | 1991–1995 (4) | 79–40 (.664) | 48–14 (.774) | 2 (23) | 1992, 1994, 1995 OVC Regular Season Champions; 1992 & 1995 OVC Tournament Champions; 1992 & 1994 OVC Coach Of The Year |
| Mark Gottfried | 1995–1998 (3) | 68–24 (.739) | 40–12 (.769) | 2 (29) | 1996, 1997, 1998 OVC Regular Season Champions; 1997 & 1998 OVC Tournament Champions; 1998 OVC Coach Of The Year |
| Tevester Anderson | 1998–2003 (5) | 103–52 (.664) | 50–24 (.675) | 2 (27) | 1999 & 2000 OVC Regular Season Champions; 1999 & 2002 OVC Tournament Champions; 1999 OVC Coach Of The Year |
| Mick Cronin | 2003–2006 (3) | 69–24 (.741) | 42–10 (.807) | 2 (28) | 2006 OVC Regular Season Champions; 2004 & 2006 OVC Tournament Champions; 2006 OVC Coach Of The Year |
| Billy Kennedy | 2006–2011 (5) | 107–53 (.668) | 70–24 (.744) | 2 (31) | 2010 & 2011 OVC Regular Season Champions; 2010 OVC Tournament Champions; 2010 & 2011 OVC Coach Of The Year |
| Steve Prohm | 2011–2015 (4) | 104–29 (.782) | 54–10 (.844) | 4 (31) | 2013, 2014, 2015 OVC West Division Season Champions; 2012 & 2015 OVC Regular Season Champions; 2012 OVC Tournament Champions; 2012 & 2015 OVC Coach Of The Year; 2012 Great Alaska Shootout Champions; 2014 CIT Postseason Tournament Champions |
| Matt McMahon | 2015–2022 (7) | 154–67 (.697) | 93–31 (.750) | 4 (31) | 2016 OVC West Division Season Co-Champions; 2018 & 2022 OVC Regular Season Champions; 2019 & 2020 OVC Regular Season Co-Champions; 2018, 2019, 2022 OVC Tournament Champions; 2022 OVC Coach of the Year |
| Steve Prohm | 2022–2025 (3) | 45–52 (.464) | 29–31 (.483) | 0 (17) | |
| Total | 1925–present (96) | 1,706–920 (.650) | 731–354 (.674) | 32 (31) | 4 OVC West Division Season Championships; 28 OVC Regular Season Championships; 18 OVC tournament championships 17 OVC Coach Of The Year Awards; 1 Great Alaska Shootout Championship; 1 CIT Postseason tournament championship |

== Players ==
=== All-Americans ===
The Racers have had 14 All-Americans; the first in 1938 and the most recent in 2019.

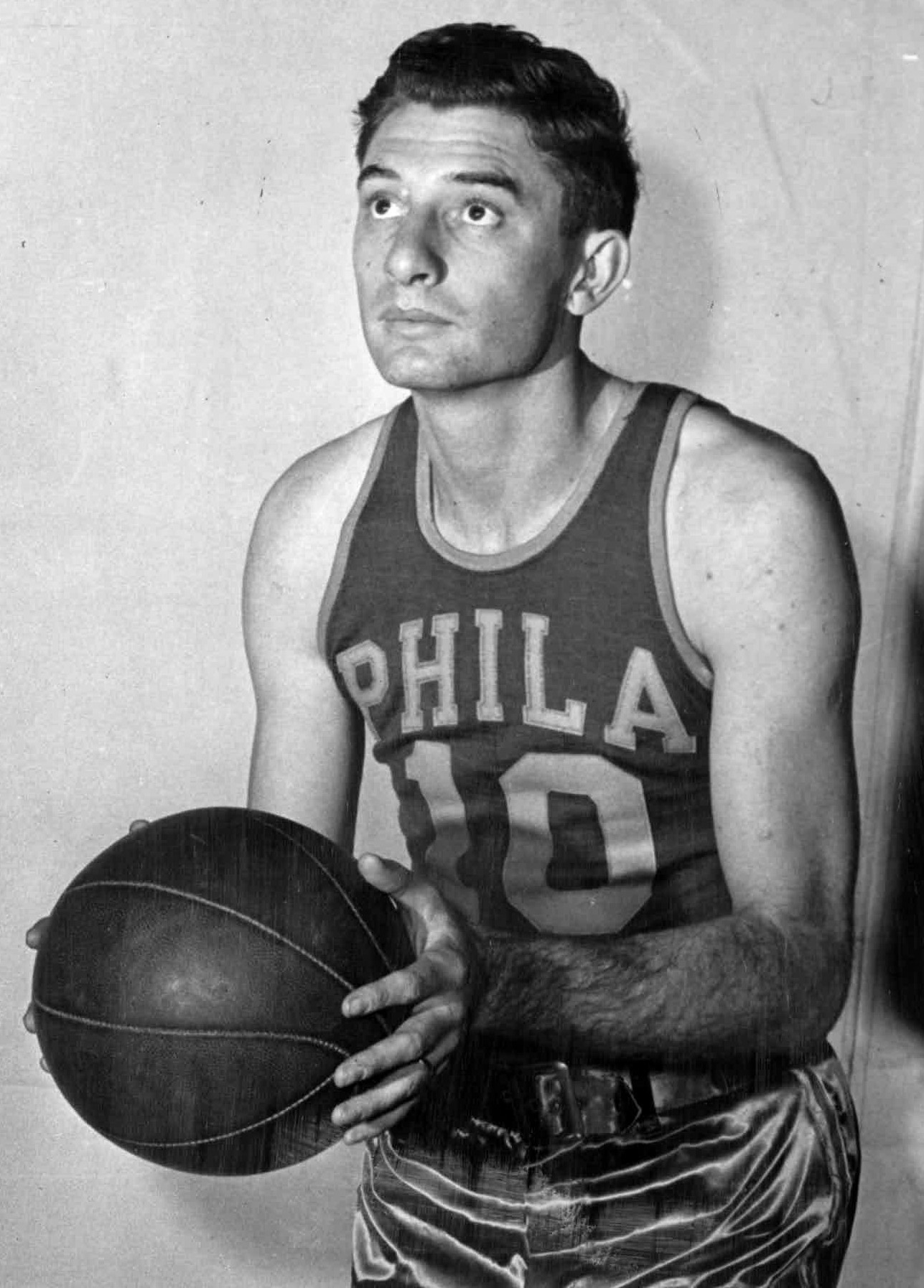
Joe Fulks is enshrined in the Basketball Hall of Fame and the College Basketball Hall of Fame.

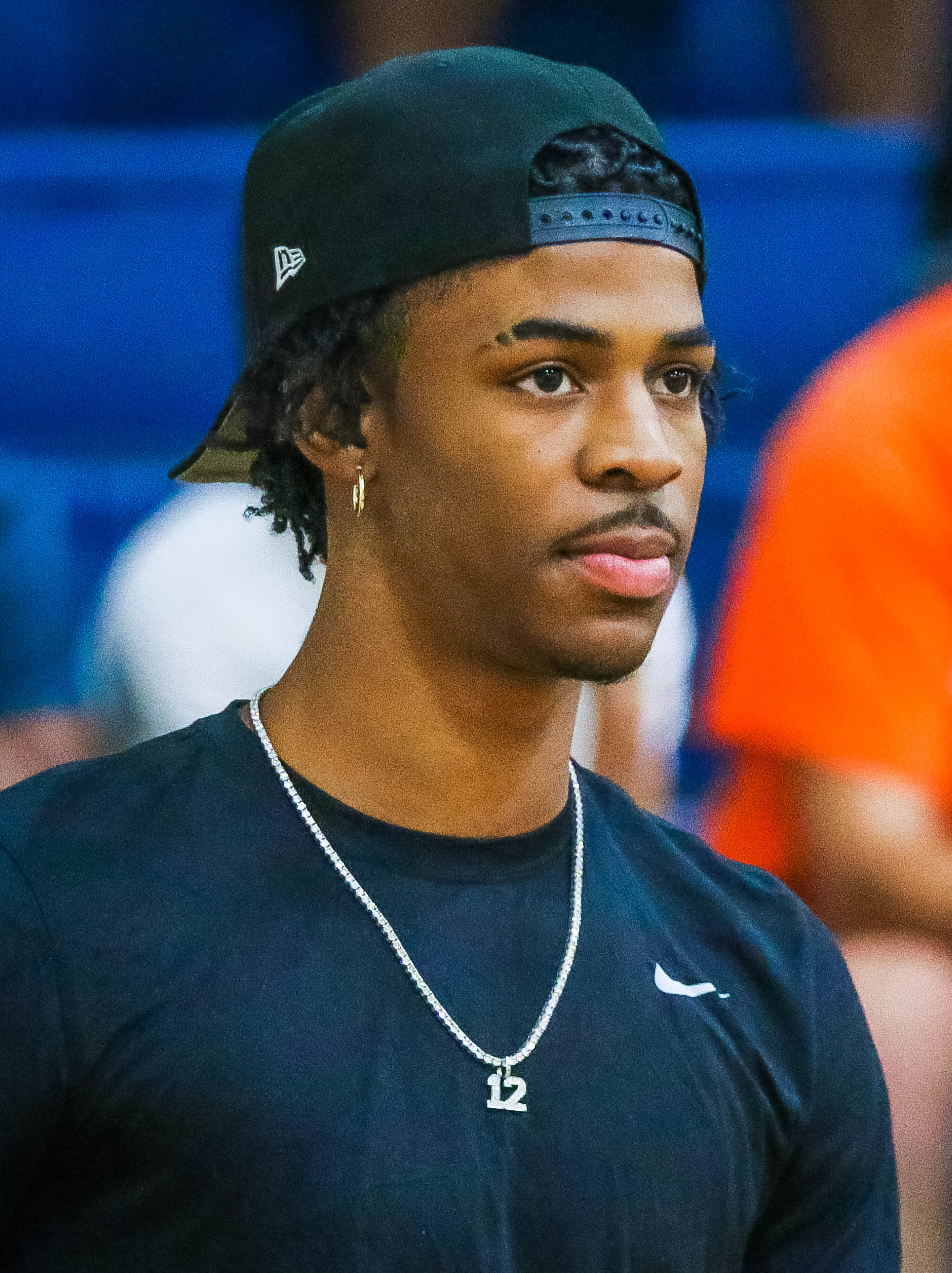
Ja Morant was a consensus First Team All-America in 2019.

| Year | Player |
| 1938 | Etheridge McKeel |
| 1941 | Bob Salmons |
| 1943 | Joe Fulks |
| 1951 | Garrett Beshear |
| 1952 | Bennie Purcell |
| 1956 | Howie Crittenden |
| 1966 | Stew Johnson |
| 1968 | Dick Cunningham |
| 1989 | Jeff Martin |
| 1992 | Popeye Jones |
| 1994 | Marcus Brown |
| 2004 | Cuthbert Victor |
| 2012 | Isaiah Canaan |
| 2019 | Ja Morant |

=== NBA draftees ===
The Racers have had 25 players selected in the NBA draft, the first being Johnny Reagan by the Chicago Stags in 1948. Twice Murray State has had two players selected in the draft, in 1967 (Herb McPherson, San Diego [now Houston] Rockets, third round; Don Duncan, San Diego Rockets, 10th round) and 1971 (Hector Blondet, Portland Trail Blazers, fifth round; Ron Johnson, Baltimore Bullets [now Washington Wizards], ninth round). Here is a list of Racers picked in the draft that posted minutes in the NBA regular season:

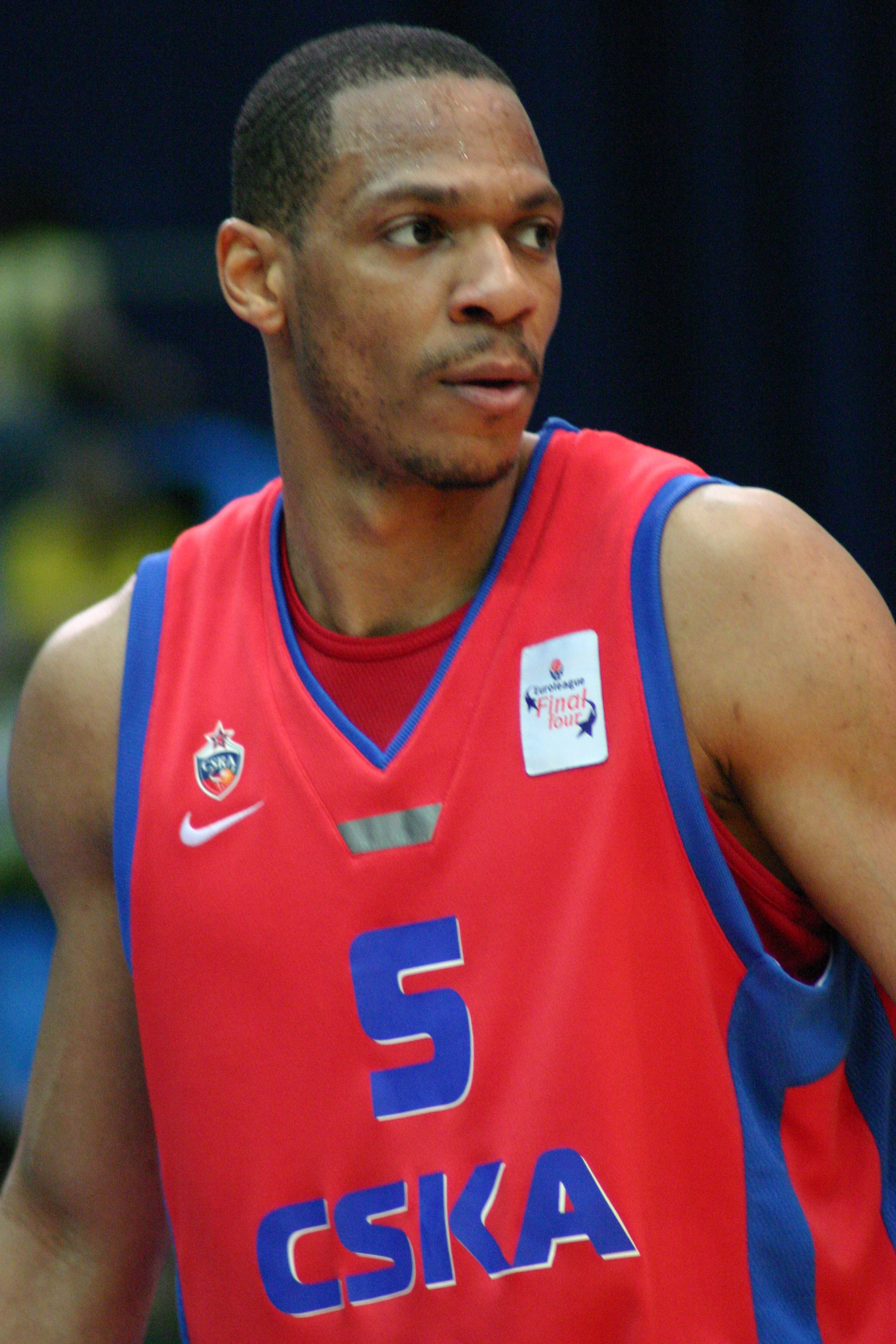
Marcus Brown scored 2,236 points while at Murray State and retired in 2011 as the EuroLeague's all-time leading scorer (2,715 points).

| Year | Round | Pick | Overall pick | Player | NBA club |
| 1966 | 3 | 1 | 21 | Stew Johnson | New York Knicks |
| 1968 | 2 | 7 | 21 | Dick Cunningham | Phoenix Suns |
| 1970 | 9 | 6 | 142 | Claude Virden | Seattle SuperSonics |
| 1989 | 2 | 4 | 31 | Jeff Martin | Los Angeles Clippers |
| 1992 | 2 | 14 | 41 | Popeye Jones | Houston Rockets |
| 1996 | 2 | 17 | 46 | Marcus Brown | Portland Trail Blazers |
| 2013 | 2 | 4 | 34 | Isaiah Canaan | Houston Rockets |
| 2015 | 1 | 14 | 14 | Cameron Payne | Oklahoma City Thunder |
| 2019 | 1 | 2 | 2 | Ja Morant | Memphis Grizzlies |

=== Retired numbers ===
The Racers have retired 15 numbers, the first in 1952 and the last in 2025. The 15 retired numbers are the most of any NCAA Division I men's program.

Murray State Racers retired numbers
| No. | Player | Career | Yr. ret. | Ref. |
| 1 | Cameron Payne | 2013–2015 | 2023 | |
| 3 | Isaiah Canaan | 2009–2013 | 2018 | |
| 5 | Marcus Brown | 1992–1996 | 2010 | |
| 10 | Lamont Sleets | 1979-1984 | 2025 | |
| 12 | Ja Morant | 2017–2019 | 2020 | |
| 15 | Jeff Martin | 1985–1989 | 1989 | |
| 16 | Garrett Beshear | 1950–1953 | 1953 | |
| 19 | Howie Crittenden | 1952–1956 | 1956 | |
| 20 | Johnny Reagan | 1945–1948 | 2003 | |
| 21 | Bennie Purcell | 1949–1952 | 1952 | |
| 26 | Joe Fulks | 1941–1943 | 2001 | |
| 30 | Paul King | 1987–1991 | 1991 | |
| 31 | Isaac Spencer | 1997-2001 | 2025 | |
| 40 | Stewart Johnson | 1963–1966 | 2023 | |
| 54 | Popeye Jones | 1988–1992 | 1992 | |

=== Scoring leaders ===
The Racers have had six players score over 2,000 points and 41 players score over 1,000 points during their careers. Marcus Brown holds the record for the most points in a single game with 45 against Washington (Mo.) on December 16, 1995. Jeff Martin holds the record for the most points in a single season with 806 during the 1987–88 season.

==== Career scoring leaders ====
| Rank | Player | Years played | Points |
| 1 | Jeff Martin | 1985–89 | 2,484 |
| 2 | Isaac Spencer | 1997–2001 | 2,248 |
| 3 | Marcus Brown | 1993–96 | 2,236 |
| 4 | Popeye Jones | 1988–92 | 2,057 |
| 5 | Isaiah Canaan | 2009–13 | 2,050 |
| 6 | Howie Crittenden | 1952–56 | 2,019 |
| 7 | Tevin Brown | 2018–22 | 1,915 |
| 8 | Lamont Sleets | 1979–84 | 1,902 |
| 9 | Vincent Rainey | 1994–97 | 1,888 |
| 10 | Frank Allen | 1989–93 | 1,811 |

== Postseason ==
=== NCAA tournament ===
The Racers have appeared in 18 NCAA tournaments. They received their highest ranking in the tournament in 2012 with a 6th seed. They have an overall 5–18 record in tournament games. Popeye Jones holds the single game scoring record with 37 points against Michigan State in 1990.

| Year | Seed | Round | Opponent | Result |
|---|---|---|---|---|
| 1964 | | Quarterfinals | Loyola Chicago | L 91–101 |
| 1969 | | Quarterfinals | Marquette | L 62–82 |
| 1988 | #14 | First round Second round | #3 North Carolina State #6 Kansas | W 78–75; L 58–61 |
| 1990 | #16 | First round | #1 Michigan State | L 71–75 ^{OT} |
| 1991 | #13 | First round | #4 Alabama | L 79–89 |
| 1992 | #14 | First round | #3 Arkansas | L 69–80 |
| 1995 | #15 | First round | #2 North Carolina | L 70–80 |
| 1997 | #15 | First round | #2 Duke | L 68–71 |
| 1998 | #9 | First round | #8 Rhode Island | L 74–97 |
| 1999 | #13 | First round | #4 Ohio State | L 58–72 |
| 2002 | #14 | First round | #3 Georgia | L 68–85 |
| 2004 | #12 | First round | #5 Illinois | L 53–72 |
| 2006 | #14 | First round | #3 North Carolina | L 65–69 |
| 2010 | #13 | First round Second round | #4 Vanderbilt #5 Butler | W 66–65; L 52–54 |
| 2012 | #6 | First round Second round | #11 Colorado State #3 Marquette | W 58–41; L 53–62 |
| 2018 | #12 | First round | #5 West Virginia | L 68–85 |
| 2019 | #12 | First round Second round | #5 Marquette #4 Florida State | W 83–64; L 62–90 |
| 2022 | #7 | First round Second round | #10 San Francisco #15 Saint Peter's | W 92–87 (OT); L 60–70 |

=== National Invitation tournament ===
In nine National Invitation Tournament (NIT) appearances, the Racers are 4–9 overall in tournament games.

| Year | Seed | Round | Opponent | Result |
|---|---|---|---|---|
| 1980 | | First round Second round Quarterfinals | Jacksonville; Alabama; Illinois | W 53–49; W 70–62; L 63–65 |
| 1982 | | First round | UNLV | L 61–87 |
| 1983 | | First round | Wake Forest | L 80–87 |
| 1989 | | First round | Penn State | L 73–89 |
| 1994 | | First round | Bradley | L 58–66 |
| 1996 | | First round | Missouri | L 85–89 |
| 2011 | #6 | First round | #3 Missouri State | L 76–89 |
| 2015 | #3 | First round Second round Quarterfinals | #6 UTEP #2 Tulsa #1 Old Dominion | W 81–66; W 83–62; L 69–72 |
| 2026 | | First round | #2 Nevada | L 75–89 |

=== CollegeInsider.com Postseason tournament ===
The Racers appeared in the 2014 CollegeInsider.com Postseason Tournament (CIT). They posted a 5–0 record to be 2014 CIT champions.

| Year | Round | Opponent | Result |
|---|---|---|---|
| 2014 | First round Second round Quarterfinals; Semifinals; Finals | Missouri State; Omaha; Towson; Pacific; Yale | W 66–63; W 86–62; W 85–73; W 98–75; W 65–57 |

=== NAIA tournament ===
The Racers appeared in the NAIA tournament seven times. Their combined record is 16–8.

| Year | Round | Opponent | Result |
|---|---|---|---|
| 1938 | First round Second round Quarterfinals; Semifinals; National 3rd-place game | Drake; Northwest Missouri State; New Mexico A&M; Roanoke; Washburn | W 47–40; W 38–30; W 30–29; L 29–35; W 33–24 |
| 1939 | First round Second round | Jordan; Manchester | W 43–37; L 39–42 |
| 1941 | First round Second round Quarterfinals; Semifinals; National Championship Game | Oregon College; Alma; Northwest Missouri State; Santa Barbara State; San Diego State | W 68–46; W 51–33; W 46–43; W 35–33; L 34–36 |
| 1942 | First round | East Central | L 45–46 ^{OT} |
| 1943 | First round Second round Quarterfinals; Semifinals; National third-place game | Southwest Missouri State; Southwestern (KS); Pepperdine; Southeast Missouri State; North Texas State | W 72–44; W 44–42; W 44–38; L 36–38; L 55–59 ^{OT} |
| 1950 | First round | Central Washington State | L 55–61 |
| 1952 | First round Second round Quarterfinals; Semifinals; National Championship Game | Centenary; West Texas State; Whitworth; Portland; Southwest Missouri State | W 72–46; W 75–73; W 81–69; W 58–57; L 64–73 |

== Bibliography ==
- Bradley, Bill (2009). ESPN College Basketball Encyclopedia: The Complete History of the Men's Game. Random House.
