= 1991–92 Murray State Racers men's basketball team =

American college basketball season

1991–92 Murray State Racers men's basketball

Ohio Valley Regular season champions Ohio Valley tournament champions

NCAA tournament, first round
- Conference: Ohio Valley Conference
- Record: 17–13 (11–3 OVC)
- Head coach: Scott Edgar (1st season)
- Home arena: Racer Arena

1991–92 Ohio Valley Conference men's basketball standings
	Conf.				Overall
Team	W		L	PCT	W		L	PCT
Murray State †	11	–	3	.786	17	–	13	.567
Eastern Kentucky	9	–	5	.643	19	–	14	.576
Middle Tennessee State	9	–	5	.643	16	–	11	.593
Tennessee Tech	8	–	6	.571	14	–	15	.483
Austin Peay	6	–	8	.429	11	–	17	.393
Morehead State	6	–	8	.429	14	–	15	.483
Southeast Missouri State	5	–	9	.357	12	–	16	.429
Tennessee State	2	–	12	.143	4	–	24	.143
† 1992 OVC tournament winner Rankings from AP Poll

The 1991–92 Murray State Racers men's basketball team represented Murray State University during the 1991–92 NCAA Division I men's basketball season. The Racers, led by first-year head coach Scott Edgar, played their home games at Racer Arena in Murray, Kentucky as members of the Ohio Valley Conference. They finished the season 17–13, 11–3 in OVC play to win the OVC regular season championship. They defeated Eastern Kentucky to win the OVC tournament to advance to the NCAA tournament for the third consecutive season. As No. 14 seed in the Midwest region, the Racers were beaten by No. 3 seed Arkansas, 80–69.

== Roster ==
1991–92 Murray State Racers men's basketball team
Players	Coaches
Pos. / # / Name / Height / Weight / Year / Previous school / Hometown; F / 54 / Popeye Jones / 6 ft 8 in (2.03 m) / 250 lb (113 kg) / Sr / Dresden HS / Dresden, TN	Head coach: Scott Edgar (Pittsburgh–Johnstown); Assistant coach(es) Legend: (C) Team captain; (S) Suspended; (I) Ineligible; (W) Walk-on; Injured; Current redshirt

== Schedule and results ==
Date time, TV	Rank^{#}	Opponent^{#}	Result	Record	Site (attendance) city, state
Regular season
Dec 3, 1991*		at Memphis State	L 54–78	0–2	Pyramid Arena; Memphis, Tennessee
Dec 19, 1991*		at Western Kentucky	L 89–93	2–4	E. A. Diddle Arena; Bowling Green, Kentucky
Dec 21, 1991*		Evansville	L 80–87	2–5	Racer Arena; Murray, Kentucky
Dec 28, 1991*		at No. 16 Missouri	L 52–92	2–6	Hearnes Center; Columbia, Missouri
Feb 3, 1992*		at Eastern Illinois	W 77–73	8–11	Lantz Arena; Charleston, Illinois
Feb 29, 1992*		Eastern Illinois	W 86–74	15–12	Racer Arena; Murray, Kentucky
Ohio Valley Conference tournament
Mar 7, 1992*		vs. Morehead State; Semifinals	W 109–77	16–12	Rupp Arena; Lexington, Kentucky
Mar 8, 1992*		vs. Eastern Kentucky; Championship Game	W 81–60	17–12	Rupp Arena; Lexington, Kentucky
NCAA tournament
Mar 19, 1992*; CBS	(14 MW)	vs. (3 MW) No. 9 Arkansas; First round	L 69–80	17–13	Bradley Center; Milwaukee, Wisconsin
*Non-conference game. ^{#}Rankings from AP Poll. (#) Tournament seedings in parentheses. MW=Midwest. All times are in Central Time.

== Awards and honors ==
- Popeye Jones – NCAA Rebounding Leader
