= Bennie Purcell =

American basketball player and tennis coach

Personal information
- Born: December 10, 1929 Mount Vernon, Illinois, U.S.
- Died: February 12, 2016 (aged 86) Murray, Kentucky, U.S.
- Listed height: 5 ft 9 in (1.75 m)
- Listed weight: 180 lb (82 kg)

Career information
- High school: Mt. Vernon (Mount Vernon, Illinois)
- College: Murray State (1949–1952)
- NBA draft: 1952: — round, —
- Drafted by: Baltimore Bullets
- Position: Guard
- Number: 21

Career history
- 1954–1959: Washington Generals

Career highlights
- NAIA tournament MVP (1952); No. 21 retired by Murray State Racers
- Stats at Basketball Reference

Bennie Allen Purcell (December 10, 1929 – February 12, 2016) was a basketball player who became a tennis coach at Murray State University, coaching the Racers for 28 years. His teams won 11 Ohio Valley Conference men's tennis championships, and he was eight times selected OVC Men's Tennis Coach of the Year.

== Collegiate basketball career ==
Previously, he played basketball at Murray State and was the first player in school history to score more than 1,000 points for his career, finishing with 1,054 points from 1948 to 1952. He was twice selected All-OVC and earned all-America honors after his play at the small college NAIB tournament in Kansas City in 1952.

== After college ==
After his college career, he toured with the Harlem Globetrotters before returning to Murray to serve as assistant basketball coach under Cal Luther before later taking over as head tennis coach in 1968.

Purcell is a member of Murray State's athletics hall of fame and his No. 21 is one of nine retired by Murray State for basketball. He was inducted into the Ohio Valley Conference Hall of Fame in 1990, the Kentucky Tennis Hall of Fame in 1994 and the Intercollegiate Tennis Association's Hall of Fame in 1999. Murray State's tennis courts are named in his honor.

=== Tennis coach awards ===
- 10× OVC champions (1980–1989)
- 8× OVC Coach of the Year (1980–1985, 1987, 1988)

== Family ==
His son, former professional tennis player Mel Purcell, succeeded him as head tennis coach at Murray State in 1996.
