= John Miller (basketball) =

American basketball coach

Biographical details
- Education: Murray State Teachers College

Coaching career (HC unless noted)
- 1932–1933: Diehlstadt HS (MO)
- 1935–1942: Murray State (freshmen)
- 1942–1947: Murray State

Head coaching record
- Overall: 63–50

John Miller was an American basketball coach who served as the head coach of the Murray State Teachers College men's basketball team from 1942 to 1947.

Miller played basketball and football at Morley High School in Morley, Missouri and Murray State Teachers College and was captain of the 1928 Murray State Thoroughbreds football team. He coached basketball Diehlstadt High School in Diehlstadt, Missouri and was the freshman basketball coach at Murray State before becoming Murray State's varsity coach in 1942. In his first season as head coach, Miller coached the Thoroughbreds, led by future Basketball Hall of Famer Joe Fulks, to a fourth-place finish in the 1943 NAIA Division I men's basketball tournament. This would be the school's only postseason appearance under Miller. He resigned three games into the 1947–48 season and was replaced by the school's first basketball coach Carlisle Cutchin.
