= 1992 Ohio Valley Conference men's basketball tournament =

- Classification: Division I
- Season: 1991–92
- Teams: 7
- Site: Rupp Arena; Lexington, Kentucky
- Champions: Murray State (6th title)
- Winning coach: Scott Edgar (1st title)
- MVP: Popeye Jones (3rd MVP) (Murray State)

1991–92 Ohio Valley Conference men's basketball standings
	Conf.				Overall
Team	W		L	PCT	W		L	PCT
Murray State †	11	–	3	.786	17	–	13	.567
Eastern Kentucky	9	–	5	.643	19	–	14	.576
Middle Tennessee State	9	–	5	.643	16	–	11	.593
Tennessee Tech	8	–	6	.571	14	–	15	.483
Austin Peay	6	–	8	.429	11	–	17	.393
Morehead State	6	–	8	.429	14	–	15	.483
Southeast Missouri State	5	–	9	.357	12	–	16	.429
Tennessee State	2	–	12	.143	4	–	24	.143
† 1992 OVC tournament winner Rankings from AP Poll

The 1992 Ohio Valley Conference men's basketball tournament was the final event of the 1991–92 season in the Ohio Valley Conference. The tournament was held March 6–8, 1992, at Rupp Arena in Lexington, Kentucky.

Murray State defeated Eastern Kentucky in the championship game, 81–60, to win their third consecutive and sixth overall OVC men's basketball tournament.

The Racers received an automatic bid to the 1992 NCAA tournament as the #13 seed in the Midwest region.

== Format ==
Seven of the eight conference members participated in the tournament field. They were seeded based on regular season conference records, with the top seed (Murray State) receiving a bye to the semifinal round. The teams were re-seeded after the opening round. Southeast Missouri State did not participate.

== Bracket ==
Quarterfinals; Tuesday, March 6
4	Tennessee Tech	89
5	Austin Peay	68
3	Middle Tennessee State	80
6	Morehead State	81
2	Eastern Kentucky	88
7	Tennessee State	67

Semifinals; Wednesday, March 7
1	Murray State	109
6	Morehead State	77
4	Tennessee Tech	67
2	Eastern Kentucky	72

Championship; Thursday, March 8
1	Murray State	81
2	Eastern Kentucky	60
