= Harlan Hodges =

American basketball coach and educator

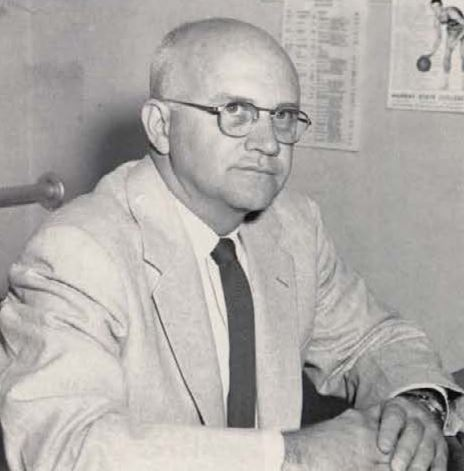
- Hodges c. 1953

Biographical details
- Born: November 11, 1902
- Died: June 6, 1994 (aged 91)

Coaching career (HC unless noted)

Football
- 1947: Southern Illinois (assistant)

Basketball
- 1933–1945: West Frankfort HS
- 1946–1947: Missouri Mines
- 1947–1948: Southern Illinois (assistant)
- 1948–1954: Murray State
- 1954–1959: Idaho

Head coaching record
- Overall: 171–152 (college basketball)

Harlan Crews Hodges (November 11, 1902 – June 6, 1994) was an American college basketball coach and educator. He was the head coach at Murray State (1948–54) and Idaho (1954–59), then became a high school administrator.

== Early career ==
Hodges' coaching career began at West Frankfort High School in West Frankfort, Illinois. In his 12 seasons at WFHS, Hodges' Redbirds won their regional tournament three times, their sectional tournament twice, and made it to the state championship four times. He spent one season as the head basketball and track coach at the Missouri School of Mines before returning to his alma mater, Southern Illinois as an assistant basketball and football coach.

== Murray State ==
Hodges was hired at Murray State College in Murray, Kentucky, in the spring of 1948. His 1950–51 and 1951–52 teams finished the year ranked No. 16 in the years' end AP poll. His teams twice made the NAIA Division I men's basketball tournament and was runner up in 1952. Two of Hodges' players at Murray State, Bennie Purcell and Garrett Beshear, received All-American honors. His overall record at Murray State was 109–66 (.623).

== Idaho ==
In May 1954, Hodges became head coach at the University of Idaho in the Pacific Coast Conference, replacing Chuck Finley, who departed after seven seasons for Mississippi Southern. His starting salary was $7,320, and in his five years in Moscow, Hodges had a 52–77 (.403) record with the Vandals and no tournament appearances. His best season was his fourth in 1957–58, when they were 17–9 (.654) and finished fourth in the PCC at 9–7. He resigned in late April 1959 to become a high school superintendent in Anna, Illinois.

== After coaching ==
After Idaho, Hodges was superintendent at Anna-Jonesboro Community High School for five years, then returned to Murray State to teach in 1964, and retired in 1973. He died in 1994 at age 91.

== Head coaching record ==
=== College basketball ===
Record table
Season	Team	Overall	Conference	Standing	Postseason
Missouri Mines Miners (Missouri Intercollegiate Athletic Association) (1947–1948)
1947–48	Missouri Mines	10–9	3–7		
Missouri Mines:		10–9	3–7		
Murray State Racers (Ohio Valley Conference) (1948–1954)
1948–49	Murray State	13–12	4–5	6th	
1949–50	Murray State	18–13	5–7	5th	NAIA First Round
1950–51	Murray State	21–6	9–3	1st	
1951–52	Murray State	24–10	9–3	3rd	NAIA Runner-up
1952–53	Murray State	18–9	7–3	3rd	
1953–54	Murray State	15–16	6–4	2nd	
Murray State:		109–66	40–25		
Idaho Vandals (Pacific Coast Conference) (1954–1959)
1954–55	Idaho	8–18	5–11	5th (North)	
1955–56	Idaho	6–19	4–12	8th	
1956–57	Idaho	10–16	4–12	7th	
1957–58	Idaho	17–9	9–7	4th	
1958–59	Idaho	11–15	6–10	7th	
Idaho:		52–77	28–52		
Total:		171–152			
National champion Postseason invitational champion Conference regular season champion Conference regular season and conference tournament champion Division regular season champion Division regular season and conference tournament champion Conference tournament champion
