= Gary Hooker =

American basketball player

Personal information
- Born: February 10, 1957 Harlem, New York, U.S.
- Died: September 2024 (aged 67)
- Listed height: 6 ft 5 in (1.96 m)
- Listed weight: 175 lb (79 kg)

Career information
- High school: Chelsea (New York City, New York)
- College: Mississippi State (1975–1978); Murray State (1979–1980)
- NBA draft: 1980: 9th round, 184th overall pick
- Drafted by: Seattle SuperSonics
- Position: Forward

Career highlights
- OVC Player of the Year (1980); First-team All-OVC (1980); SEC All-Freshman team (1976)
- Stats at Basketball Reference

Gary Ray Hooker (February 10, 1957 – September 2024) was an American basketball player. He played college basketball for the Mississippi State Bulldogs and Murray State Racers. Hooker was selected as the Ohio Valley Conference (OVC) Player of the Year during his only season with the Racers in 1980. He was selected in the fourth round of the 1980 NBA draft by the Seattle SuperSonics and played for the Harlem Globetrotters.

== Early life ==
Hooker was born on February 10, 1957, and raised in a low-rent housing project in Harlem, New York. He started playing sports when he was seven and focused on basketball when he was nine. Hooker played basketball on the playgrounds of New York City where he developed an outside shot because he was thin and "it was dangerous" to play close to the rim.

Hooker attended Chelsea High School and played on the basketball team. He averaged 23 points and 20.2 rebounds per game during his senior season. Hooker committed to play college basketball for the Mississippi State Bulldogs because he wanted to "see something different" than his native New York.

== College career ==
With the Mississippi State Bulldogs, Hooker was named to the All-Southeastern Conference (SEC) freshman team in 1976. He started for the Bulldogs during his freshman and sophomore seasons under head coach Kermit Davis but was moved to the bench by new coach Ron Greene during his junior season for disciplinary reasons. When Greene left to join the Murray State Racers in 1978, Hooker decided to follow so that he would not have to go through the experience of having another head coach. In a 1980 interview, Hooked stated that he "was flunking out of school almost anyway" and Mississippi State "might have been glad to get rid of me." Hooker left the Bulldogs ranked 13th in scoring with 1,114 career points.

Due to transfer rules, Hooker had to sit out the 1978–79 season which he utilised to improve his academics. He was selected in the ninth round of the 1979 NBA draft by the Washington Bullets. Hooker did not consider passing up his final year of collegiate eligibility because he "like[d] college ball too much to give it up before [he] had to."

Hooker averaged 18.6 points and 12.3 rebounds per game during the 1979–80 season. He led the Racers to a 23–8 record and an appearance in the 1980 National Invitation Tournament. Hooker was named as the Ohio Valley Conference (OVC) Player of the Year.

== Professional career ==
Hooker was selected by the Seattle SuperSonics in the fourth round of the 1980 NBA draft. On September 22, 1980, Hooker was cut by the SuperSonics. Head coach Lenny Wilkens explained that he wanted to give more playing time to his experienced players and "there was just no way possible" Hooker could have made the team. Hooker thought that he received rough treatment from the SuperSonics and the experience soured him on wanting to play in the National Basketball Association (NBA). He had no plans after his college graduation other than playing basketball and briefly worked as a gardener.

On December 26, 1980, Hooker joined the Harlem Globetrotters. He played for the Globetrotters until 1984.

== Personal life ==
Hooker was married and had a daughter.

Hooker died in September 2024.
