= Fred Overton =

American basketball coach and motivational speaker (1938–2019)

Biographical details
- Born: November 9, 1938; Crofton, Kentucky, U.S.
- Died: October 27, 2019 (aged 80); Georgia, USA, U.S.

Coaching career (HC unless noted)
- 1963–1969: Austin Peay (assistant)
- 1969–1971: Pepperdine (assistant)
- 1971–1974: Murray State (assistant)
- 1974–1978: Murray State

Head coaching record
- Overall: 44–59

Accomplishments and honors

Awards
- Ohio Valley Conference Co-Coach of the Year: 1976-77

Fred Henry Overton Jr. (November 9, 1938 – October 27, 2019) was a former head basketball coach at Murray State University and a nationwide motivational speaker. He was a former student of Charles Stanley's Luther Rice Seminary.

== Basketball ==
Overton began his coaching career as an assistant at Austin Peay State University in 1963. In 1969, he moved cross country to coach at Pepperdine University. In 1971, he returned to the Ohio Valley Conference to serve as assistant to Cal Luther at Murray State University. In 1974, he was elevated to the head coaching position. Overton served as head coach for four seasons at Murray State, with his best season in 1976–77, when his team posted a 17–10 overall record and finished tied for second in the OVC with a 9–5 record. After the season, he was named OVC Co-Coach of the Year. He resigned at the end of the 1977–78 season because the he had not achieved "the winning success" he had hoped to. His overall record as Racers head coach was 44–59.

== Religion ==
In 1980, Overton was saved under the preaching of Charles Stanley. During the 1980s, he was in full-time secular sales work, taught adult Sunday School at First Baptist Atlanta and attended Luther Rice Seminary by correspondence. In September 1991, Fred was called into full-time Christian work, teaching his seminar "Is the Bible Reliable?". Since then he developed additional five seminars. His teaching ministry was nationwide.
