= Racer Arena =

Multi-purpose arena in Murray, Kentucky

Coordinates: 36°36′52″N 88°19′14″W

- Interactive map of Racer Arena
- Former names: MSU Fieldhouse, Cutchin Fieldhouse, Carr Health Building
- Location: Corner of Payne and N. 14th Sts., Murray, KY 42071
- Owner: Murray State University
- Operator: Murray State University
- Capacity: 5,550

Construction
- Opened: 1954

Tenants
- Murray State Racers (women's volleyball) high school ice Hockey (2020–present)

Racer Arena is a multi-purpose arena in Murray, Kentucky. It is the current home of the Murray State University women's volleyball team. Racer Arena became the largest capacity volleyball-only facility among NCAA Division I schools after the University of Arkansas added gymnastics to its previously volleyball-only Barnhill Arena in 2003.

The 5,550-seat Racer Arena, originally known as the Fieldhouse, opened on December 11, 1954. The original construction cost of the area was $372,571.80. Prior to the construction of Racer Arena, intercollegiate basketball games had been played in the Carr Health Building since 1937. Racer Arena hosted the Ohio Valley Conference men's basketball tournament in 1983, 1988, 1990, and 1991. In 1993, the building housing Racer Arena was named Cutchin Fieldhouse, in honor of former Murray State coach and administrator Carlisle Cutchin. Racer Arena was known for the home-court advantage it provided to the Murray State basketball program. The density of the traditional bowl style seating area, close exterior walls, and low ceiling in relation to the seats led to very intense crowd noise. In addition, the seating area extended very close to the playing surface and team benches, which added to the hostile environment for visiting teams. With the seating area so close to the playing court, the press area was located at the top of the seating area instead of courtside.

While Racer Arena's official capacity was 5,550, sellouts were common with the area and more than 6,000 fans packed the stands on numerous occasions. By the early 1970s, records indicate that the capacity was already seen as insufficient to meet the needs of demand from the campus and community for attendance at varsity basketball games. Serious discussions of the need to construct a modern area began in 1978 when Ron Greene took over the basketball program, but plans for a new arena wouldn't actually start to become a reality until the early 1990s when funding was finally approved. Racer Arena remained home to the Murray State men's and women's basketball teams until they moved to the venue now known as CFSB Center in 1998.
