= Ron Greene =

American college basketball coach (1938–2021)

Biographical details
- Born: December 27, 1938; Terre Haute, Indiana, U.S.
- Died: March 31, 2021 (aged 82); Murray, Kentucky, U.S.

Playing career
- 1960–1962: Murray State

Coaching career (HC unless noted)
- 1965–1966: Loyola (LA) (assistant)
- 1966–1968: Loyola (LA)
- 1969–1977: New Orleans
- 1977–1978: Mississippi State
- 1978–1985: Murray State
- 1985–1989: Indiana State
- 1991: Nashville Stars
- 1992–1999: Calloway County HS
- 2007–2008: Kentucky Retros
- 2008–2011: Murray HS

Head coaching record
- Overall: 339–258 (college)

Accomplishments and honors

Awards
- AP SEC Coach of the Year (1978); 2× OVC Coach of the Year (1980, 1983)

Ronald L. Greene (December 27, 1938 – March 31, 2021) was an American basketball coach who served as head coach of three Division I college basketball teams, as well as teams in Division II, the World Basketball League, the American Basketball Association, and high school.

== Early career ==
Born in Terre Haute, Indiana, Greene was a high school star for the legendary Howard Sharpe at Terre Haute's Gerstmeyer Tech High. He began his college career as a freshman member of the Bradley Braves; he subsequently transferred to Murray State, completing his eligibility under Head Coach Cal Luther. While at Murray, he received his Bachelor of Science degree in Health and Physical Education and was a member of Sigma Chi fraternity. His coaching career began in 1965 at Loyola University New Orleans where he was an assistant coach under Head Coach Bill Gardiner. The team went 9–17 in his only season as an assistant before being promoted to the head coach position. He spent two seasons as Head Coach before moving across town to assume control of the University of New Orleans program.

== University of New Orleans ==
Greene was hired by UNO when the school began intercollegiate varsity competition in 1969–70 season. He compiled a 149–64 (.700) record in eight seasons; leading the Privateers to a #1 final ranking for the 1970–71 season and a #2 final ranking for the 1974–75 season. Four of his teams qualified for NCAA tournaments. The Privateers finished fourth in 1974 Division II tourney and second in the 1975 tourney. Greene paved the way for the Privateers’ move to Division I in the 1975–76 season.

== Mississippi State University ==
Greene only spent the 1977–1978 season with the Bulldogs. That year, the Bulldogs finished with an 18–9 record. Several hours after The Associated Press had named him the Southeastern Conference basketball coach of the year and the Mississippi state board had voted him a $7,500 raise, Greene announced he was leaving the job to become coach of his alma mater Murray State.

== Murray State University ==
After managing only 4 wins in his first season in Murray, Greene coached the Racers to 23 wins the following year and an appearance in the National Invitation Tournament. The Racers knocked off Jacksonville and Alabama before losing to Illinois 65–63 in the Quarterfinals. Greene's Racers would reach the NIT twice more before he left in 1985. His overall record at Murray was 119–78. While at the Racer helm, Greene coached Racer greats, such as Gary Hooker and Lamont Sleets.

== Indiana State University ==
Greene returned to his native Terre Haute in 1985 when he became head coach of the Indiana State Sycamores. Greene inherited a young team and finished 11–17 in his first season as head coach. The team, however never matched this success and Greene resigned after an abysmal 4–24 record in the 1988–89 season. His overall record at ISU was 31–82.

One of his players was Eddie Bird, the younger brother of NBA player Larry Bird.

== Later career ==
Greene was head coach of the Nashville Stars during the 1991 WBL season. The Stars went 23–28 in their first and only season of existence. He resigned in July 1991 to become the 12th head coach at Calloway County High School. His tenure at Calloway County started rough, including a 16-game losing streak in his first season. Greene posted a few good seasons for the Lakers including a 23–6 season as well as two 17–9 seasons, spending 8 years at Calloway. He resigned following the 1999 season and former Murray State and Western Kentucky player Terry Birdsong took over. He returned to coaching in 2007 when he was named head coach of the ABA’s Kentucky Retros. In 2008 Greene was named head coach at Murray High School. He retired after the 2010–11 season.

Greene died on March 31, 2021, in Murray, Kentucky, at age 82.

== Head coaching record ==
Record table
Season	Team	Overall	Conference	Standing	Postseason
Loyola (New Orleans) Wolf Pack (Independent) (1966–1968)
1966–67	Loyola (New Orleans)	11–11			
1967–68	Loyola (New Orleans)	11–14			
Loyola (New Orleans):		22–25	0–0		
New Orleans Privateers (Independent/Sun Belt Conference) (1969–1977)
1969–70	New Orleans	18–5			
1970–71	New Orleans	23–3			Division II South Regional
1971–72	New Orleans	19–9			Division II South Regional
1972–73	New Orleans	9–13			
1973–74	New Orleans	21–9			Division II National Tournament Final Four
1974–75	New Orleans	23–7			Division II National Tournament Runner-up
1975–76	New Orleans	18–8			
1976–77	New Orleans	18–10	4–2		
New Orleans:		149–64	4–2		
Mississippi State Bulldogs (Southeastern Conference) (1977–1978)
1977–78	Mississippi State	18–9	13–5	2nd	
Mississippi State:		18–9	13–5		
Murray State Racers (Ohio Valley Conference) (1978–1985)
1978–79	Murray State	4–22	2–10	7th	
1979–80	Murray State	23–8	10–2	1st	1980 National Invitation Tournament
1980–81	Murray State	17–10	10–4	2nd	
1981–82	Murray State	20–8	13–3	1st	1982 National Invitation Tournament
1982–83	Murray State	21–8	11–3	1st	1983 National Invitation Tournament
1983–84	Murray State	15–13	7–7	4th	
1984–85	Murray State	19–9	8–6	4th	
Murray State:		119–78	61–35		
Indiana State Sycamores (Missouri Valley) (1985–1989)
1985–86	Indiana State	11–17	5–11	7th	
1986–87	Indiana State	9–20	4–10	T–7th	
1987–88	Indiana State	7–21	2–12	8th	
1988–89	Indiana State	4–24	0–14	8th	
Indiana State:		31–82	11–47		
Total:		339–258 (.568)			
National champion Postseason invitational champion Conference regular season champion Conference regular season and conference tournament champion Division regular season champion Division regular season and conference tournament champion Conference tournament champion
