= Rice Mountjoy =

Biographical details
- Born: April 21, 1901; Kentucky, US
- Died: May 6, 1985 (aged 84); Florence, Kentucky, US

Coaching career (HC unless noted)
- 1924: Frankfort High School
- 1925–1928: Kavanaugh High School
- 1928–41: Danville High School
- 1941–42: Murray State
- 1942–45: Tilghman High School
- 1946–1953: Dixie Heights High School
- 1954–1959: Boone County High School

Head coaching record
- Overall: 18–4 (college basketball)

James Rice Mountjoy (April 21, 1901 – May 6, 1985) was an American high school athletics coach in Kentucky and was the head coach of the Murray State Teachers College men's basketball team during the 1941–42 season.

A former track star at Centre College, Mountjoy began his coaching career in 1924 at Frankfort High School, where he coached the basketball team the quarterfinals of the state tournament. In 1925 he returned alma mater, Kavanaugh High School where his players included Forrest Sale and Paul McBrayer. He spent 13 years as the athletic director and head football, basketball, and track coach at Danville High School where he compiled a 95–21–10 record in football and only two of his 13 basketball teams failed to reach the regional tournament. In his only season as Murray State's basketball coach, the Thoroughbreds went 18–4 and earned a spot in the 1942 NAIA Division I men's basketball tournament. One of Mountjoy's players was future Basketball Hall of Famer Joe Fulks.

Mountjoy left Murray State in 1942 to coach football at Tilghman High School. In his three seasons at THS, his football teams amassed a 22–5 record. From 1946 to 1953, Mountjoy was the head football coach and athletic director at Dixie Heights High School. He spent six seasons as head football coach and athletic director at Boone County High School before retiring in 1959.
