= 1941 NAIA basketball tournament =

College basketball tournament

1941 NAIA men's basketball tournament
- Teams: 32
- Finals site: Municipal Auditorium, Kansas City, Missouri
- Champions: San Diego State (1st title, 3rd title game, 3rd Final Four)
- Runner-up: Murray State (1st title game, 2nd Final Four)
- Semifinalists: West Texas State (1st Final Four); Santa Barbara (1st Final Four)
- MVP: Charles Thomas (Northwestern State)

The 1941 NAIA basketball tournament was held in March at Municipal Auditorium in Kansas City, Missouri. The 5th annual NAIA basketball tournament featured 32 teams playing in a single-elimination format.

The third time was the charm for the San Diego State Aztecs. After losing the previous two years to Southwestern College and Tarkio College, the Aztecs finally won beating Murray State, 36–34.

It also was the first time that the tournament MVP was awarded to a player whose team did not win the championship, or make the NAIA Final Four (Charles Thomas played for Northwestern State which lost in the second round to Texas Wesleyan. San Diego State was the first team to make it to the championship game three times.

== Awards and honors ==
Many of the records set by the 1941 tournament have been broken, and many of the awards were established much later:

- Leading scorer est. 1963
- Leading rebounder est. 1963
- Charles Stevenson Hustle Award est. 1958
- Coach of the Year est. 1954
- Player of the Year est. 1994

== Bracket ==
First round	Second round
West Texas State	77
Dubuque	39
West Texas State	52
St. Mary’s (MN)	39
Saint Mary’s (MN)	38
Tarkio	28
TOP TIER
Superior State	51
Morningside	42
Superior State	45
Delta State	53
Delta State	52
Sioux Falls	35
Northwestern State (LA)	50
Central Missouri State	43
Northwestern State (LA)	47
Texas Wesleyan	56
Texas Wesleyan	71
Evansville	62
TOP TIER
Culver-Stockton	40
Texas Western	26
Culver-Stockton	41*
San Diego State	46
San Diego State	46
Western Montana	29
Stephen F. Austin	64
Simpson	50
Stephen F. Austin	28
NW Missouri State	34
NW Missouri State	35
Dakota Wesleyan	31
BOTTOM TIER
Alma	43
Panhandle A&M	24
Alma	33
Murray State	51
Murray State	68
Oregon College	46
Appalachian State	63
Baker (KS)	42
Appalachian State	48
Baltimore	36
Baltimore	52
Omaha	35
BOTTOM TIER
Santa Barbara	32
Wayne State (NE)	26
Bemidji State	29*
Santa Barbara	31
Bemidji State	35
Pittsburg State	33

Elite Eight
West Texas State	54
Delta State	34
Texas Wesleyan	42
San Diego State	44
NW Missouri State	43
Murray State	46
Appalachian State	29
Santa Barbara	36

NAIA national semifinals
West Texas State	40
San Diego State	43
Murray State	35
Santa Barbara	33

NAIA national championship
San Diego State	36
Murray State	34
NAIA Third-place game
West Texas State	43
Santa Barbara	35

- * denotes overtime.

== See also ==
- 1941 NCAA basketball tournament
- 1941 National Invitation Tournament
