= Carlisle Cutchin =

American athletics coach and college athletics administrator

Biographical details
- Born: February 11, 1885; Calloway County, Kentucky, U.S.
- Died: August 20, 1953 (aged 68); Murray, Kentucky, U.S.
- Education: Kentucky

Coaching career (HC unless noted)

Football
- 1919–1924: Mayfield HS (KY)
- 1925–1930: Murray State

Basketball
- 1925–1941: Murray State
- 1947–1948: Murray State (interim HC)

Baseball
- 1928–1932: Murray State
- 1941: Murray State
- 1946–1953: Murray State

Administrative career (AD unless noted)
- 1925–1940: Murray State

Head coaching record
- Overall: 37–11–4 (college football); 307–106 (college basketball); 47–91–3 (college baseball)

Accomplishments and honors

Championships
- Football; 1 MVC (1928)

Carlisle Cutchin (February 11, 1885 – August 20, 1953) was an American football, baseball, and basketball coach and college athletics administrator at Murray State University—then known as Murray State Normal School, Murray State Normal School and Teachers College, and Murray State Teachers College.

After serving as football coach at Mayfield High School in Mayfield, Kentucky, Cutchin joined Murray State in 1925 as the school's football and basketball coach. From 1925 to 1941 he led the basketball team to a 296–96 record and three appearances in the NAIA Men's Basketball Championships, where the Thoroughbreds finished third in 1938 and second in 1941. As head football coach, Cutchin coached Murray State to a 37–11–4 record over six seasons. His .750 winning percentage as football coach is the highest in school history. Cutchin was also the head baseball coach at Murray State from 1928 to 1932, in 1941, and from 1946 to 1953. His record as baseball coach was 47–91–3.

In 1947, Cutchin was once again hired to coach Murray State basketball after the resignation of John Miller. Murray State finished the year 11–10 under Cutchin.

Cutchin died on August 20, 1953, after suffering a heart attack at his home in Murray, Kentucky.

Cutchin Field, the home field for Murray State's soccer teams, and Cutchin Fieldhouse, Murray State's volleyball arena, are named after Cutchin. He was inducted into the Murray State Athletics Hall of Fame in 1970, the first ever coach to receive the honor.

== Head coaching record ==
=== College football ===
| Year | Team | Overall | Conference | Standing | Bowl/playoffs |
|---|---|---|---|---|---|
Murray State Blue and Gold (Independent) (1925–1927)
| 1925 | Murray State | 6–0–1 | | | |
| 1926 | Murray State | 5–2–1 | | | |
| 1927 | Murray State | 7–1–1 | | | |
Murray State Thoroughbreds (Mississippi Valley Conference) (1928–1930)
| 1928 | Murray State | 9–0–1 | 6–0 | 1st | |
| 1929 | Murray State | 5–4 | 3–1 | 2nd | |
| 1930 | Murray State | 5–4 | | | |
| Murray State: | | 37–11–4 | | | |
| Total: | | 37–11–4 | | | |
National championship Conference title Conference division title or championship game berth
