= 1952 NAIA basketball tournament =

College basketball tournament

1952 NAIA men's basketball tournament
- Season: 1951–52
- Teams: 32
- Finals site: Municipal Auditorium; Kansas City, Missouri
- Champions: Southwest Missouri State (1st title, 1st title game, 1st Final Four)
- Runner-up: Murray State (2nd title game, 4th Final Four)
- Semifinalists: Southwest Texas State (1st Final Four); Portland (1st Final Four)
- MVP: Bennie Purcell (Murray State)

The 1952 NAIA basketball tournament was held in March at Municipal Auditorium in Kansas City, Missouri. The 15th annual NAIA basketball tournament featured 32 teams playing in a single-elimination format. In 1952, the National Association of Intercollegiate Basketball (NAIB) changes its name to the National Association of Intercollegiate Athletics (NAIA)

The championship game featured Southwest Missouri State, now Missouri State University, who defeated Murray State, 73–64.

Finishing out the NAIA Final Four, and playing for the 3rd place game were Southwest Texas State, now Texas State University–San Marcos, and Portland. The Bears of Southwest Missouri State defeated the Pilots of Portland, 78–68.

A notorious game happened in the first round between Morningside and Pepperdine. There was a tournament record of forty personal fouls between the two teams in one game. Incidentally, Morningside would win the game 84 to 80.

== Awards and honors ==
Many of the records set by the 1952 tournament have been broken, and many of the awards were established much later:

- Leading scorer est. 1963
- Leading rebounder est. 1963
- Charles Stevenson Hustle Award est. 1958
- Coach of the Year est. 1954
- Player of the Year est. 1994
- Most personal fouls in one game: 40, Pepperdine (Calif.) vs. Morningside (Iowa)
- All-time scoring leader; first appearance: E.C. O'Neal, 9th, Arkansas Tech (1952,53,54,55), 13 games, 122 field goals, 43 free throws, totaling 287 points, 22.1 average per game.
- All-time scoring leaders; third appearance: Lloyd Thorgaard, 10th, Hamline (Minn.) (1950,51,52,53), 15 games, 111 field goals, 61 free throws, 283 total points, 18.9 average per game; James Fritsche, 14th, Hamline (Minn.) (1950,51,52,53), 15 games, 113 field goals, 46 free throws, 272 total points, 18.1 average per game.

== Bracket ==
First round	Second round
Montana State	82
American International	66
Montana State	72
Hamline	85
Hamline	91
Tampa	65
TOP TIER
Portland	84
Findlay	82
Portland	72
Memphis State	48
Memphis State	60
Baltimore	39
West Texas State	88
West Liberty State	69
West Texas State	73*
Murray State	75
Murray State	72
Centenary (LA)	46
TOP TIER
Whitworth	71
Whitewater State	60
Whitworth	72
Millikin	71
Millikin	101
Elon	69
Southwest Missouri State	87
Chadron State	66
Southwest Missouri State	82
Indiana State	64
Indiana State	79
Fairleigh Dickinson	72
BOTTOM TIER
Morningside	84
Pepperdine	80
Morningside	98
Eastern Illinois State	93
Eastern Illinois State	113
Huron	78
Utah State	85
Clarion State	68
Utah State	63
Lawrence Tech	72
Lawrence Tech	97
Washburn	80
BOTTOM TIER
New Mexico A&M	86
Mississippi Southern	70
New Mexico A&M	52
Southwest Texas State	69
Southwest Texas State	97
Arkansas Tech	53

Elite Eight
Hamline	65
Portland	75
Murray State	81
Whitworth	69
Southwest Missouri State	87
Morningside	74
Lawrence Tech	57
Southwest Texas State	65

NAIA national semifinals
Portland	57
Murray State	58
Southwest Missouri State	70
Southwest Texas State	67**

NAIA national championship
Murray State	64
Southwest Missouri State	73
NAIA third-place game
Portland	68
Southwest Texas State	78

- * denotes each overtime.

== See also ==
- 1952 NCAA basketball tournament
- 1952 National Invitation Tournament
