= Scott Edgar (basketball) =

American college basketball coach

Current position
- Team: Eastern Oklahoma State
- Conference: Bi-State
- Record: 181–120–3 (.600)

Biographical details
- Born: December 14, 1955 (age 70); Penn Hills, Pennsylvania, U.S.

Playing career
- 1974–1978: Pittsburgh–Johnstown

Coaching career (HC unless noted)
- 1978–1980: New Mexico Military (assistant)
- 1980–1985: Tulsa (assistant)
- 1985–1991: Arkansas (assistant)
- 1991–1995: Murray State
- 1995–1998: Duquesne
- 2002–2005: UAB (assistant)
- 2005–2006: Tennessee (assistant)
- 2006–2008: Southeast Missouri State
- 2010–2022: Eastern Oklahoma State

Administrative career (AD unless noted)
- 1999–2001: TCU (director of operations)

Head coaching record
- Overall: 120–134 (.472) (college); 211–143–3 (.595) (junior college)
- Tournaments: 0–2 (NCAA); 0–1 (NIT); 2–2 (NJCAA)

Accomplishments and honors

Championships
- 2× OVC tournament (1992, 1995); 3× OVC regular season (1992, 1994, 1995)

Awards
- 2× OVC Coach of the Year (1992, 1994)

Scott William Edgar (born December 14, 1955) is an American college basketball coach who is currently the men's basketball head coach at Eastern Oklahoma State College. He was formerly head coach at Duquesne University, Murray State University and Southeast Missouri State University.

== Early life and education ==
Edgar graduated from Penn Hills High School in Penn Hills, Pennsylvania. At the University of Pittsburgh at Johnstown, Edgar played basketball and baseball. He graduated from Pittsburgh–Johnstown in 1978 with a bachelor's degree in sociology.

== Coaching career ==
Edgar first coached at New Mexico Military Institute in 1978. Nolan Richardson hired him as one of his first assistants at the University of Tulsa in 1980, his first position in Division I. Edgar followed Richardson to Arkansas in 1985 and continued as Richardson's assistant until getting his first head coaching position at Murray State in 1991. He led the Racers to two NCAA tournament appearances in four seasons.

In 1995, Edgar accepted the head coaching position at Duquesne. He was unable to turn the Duquesne Dukes around, however, and was let go after three seasons. From 1999 to 2001, Edgar was director of basketball operations at TCU under Billy Tubbs. Edgar returned to coaching in 2002 at UAB under Mike Anderson, where he helped UAB qualify for the 2003 NIT quarterfinals and 2004 NCAA tournament Sweet 16. In the 2005–06 season, Edgar was on Bruce Pearl's staff on a Tennessee team that won the Southeast Conference East Division title.

On April 13, 2006, Edgar was named head coach at Southeast Missouri State. This position brought him back to the Ohio Valley Conference (OVC), where he started with Murray State. Edgar had success in the OVC, with a 65-27 conference record, winning three regular season championships, two tournament championships, and two coach of the year awards, all with Murray State University.

On October 9, 2008, Southeast Missouri State fired athletic director Don Kaverman and suspended Edgar after the NCAA notified the university of possible major violations, three months after both the men's and women's basketball programs were placed on two years' probation by the NCAA. On December 31, 2008, new athletic director John Shafer fired Edgar and bought out the final two years of Edgar's contract. The NCAA investigation concluded in August 2009 and found that impermissible tuition payments and violations of rules about summer conditioning activities and observing pickup games happened under Edgar's watch; Edgar's appeal was rejected in June 2010.

He was named men's basketball head coach at Eastern Oklahoma State College, a junior college, in the spring of 2010.

== Head coaching record ==
=== College ===
Record table
Season	Team	Overall	Conference	Standing	Postseason
Murray State Racers (Ohio Valley Conference) (1991–1995)
1991–92	Murray State	17–13	11–3	1st	NCAA Division I Round of 64
1992–93	Murray State	18–12	11–5	T–2nd	
1993–94	Murray State	23–6	15–1	1st	NIT first round
1994–95	Murray State	21–9	11–5	T–1st	NCAA Division I Round of 64
Murray State:		79–40 (.664)	48–14 (.774)		
Duquesne Dukes (Atlantic-10 Conference) (1995–1998)
1995–96	Duquesne	9–18	3–13	T–5th (West)	
1996–97	Duquesne	9–18	5–11	T–5th (West)	
1997–98	Duquesne	11–19	5–11	T–4th (West)	
Duquesne University:		29–55 (.345)	13–35 (.271)		
Southeast Missouri State Redhawks (Ohio Valley Conference) (2006–2008)
2006–07	Southeast Missouri State	11–20	9–11	6th	
2007–08	Southeast Missouri State	1–19*	1–13*	11th*	
Southeast Missouri State:		12–39 (.235)	10–24 (.294)		
Total:		120–134 (.472)			
National champion Postseason invitational champion Conference regular season champion Conference regular season and conference tournament champion Division regular season champion Division regular season and conference tournament champion Conference tournament champion

* 11 wins (including six conference wins) were vacated from the 2007–08 season due to NCAA violations. The original season record was 12–19 (7–13, 9th in OVC).

=== Junior college ===
Record table
Season	Team	Overall	Conference	Standing	Postseason
Eastern Oklahoma State Mountaineers (Bi-State Conference) (2010–present)
2010–11	Eastern Oklahoma State	18–12			
2011–12	Eastern Oklahoma State	32–5			NJCAA Fourth Place
2012–13	Eastern Oklahoma State	13–12–3	7–8–3		
2013–14	Eastern Oklahoma State	21–10	10–8	6th	
2014–15	Eastern Oklahoma State	16–13	6–11	6th	
2015–16	Eastern Oklahoma State	18–14	9–10	T–7th	
2016–17	Eastern Oklahoma State	17–13	6–10	T–6th	
2017–18	Eastern Oklahoma State	15–13	4–12	8th	
2018–19	Eastern Oklahoma State	20–9	8–8	T–4th	
2019–20	Eastern Oklahoma State	11–19	6–11	7th	
2020–21	Eastern Oklahoma State	10–12	6–11	8th	
2021–22	Eastern Oklahoma State	20–11	8–8	6th	
Eastern Oklahoma State:		211–143–3 (.595)	70–100–3 (.413)		
Total:		211–143–3 (.595)			
