= 1943 NAIA basketball tournament =

College basketball tournament

1943 NAIA men's basketball tournament
- Teams: 32
- Finals site: Municipal Auditorium; Kansas City, Missouri
- Champions: Southeast Missouri State (1st title, 1st title game, 1st Final Four)
- Runner-up: Northwest Missouri State (1st title game, 1st Final Four)
- Semifinalists: North Texas State (1st Final Four); Murray State (3rd Final Four)
- MVP: Belus Smawley (Appalachian State (N.C.))

The 1943 NAIA basketball tournament was held in March at Municipal Auditorium in Kansas City, Missouri. The 7th annual NAIA basketball tournament featured 32 teams playing in a single-elimination format. The championship game featured Southeast Missouri State defeating Northwest Missouri State 34–32.

This was the first tournament to feature a championship game between two teams from the same state, Missouri, playing in Missouri. The 3rd place game featured the first overtime in the NAIA Final Four history when North Texas State defeated Murray State 59–55 in one overtime.

== Awards and honors ==
Many of the records set by the 1943 tournament have been broken, and many of the awards were established much later:

- Leading scorer est. 1963
- Leading rebounder est. 1963
- Charles Stevenson Hustle Award est. 1958
- Coach of the Year est. 1954
- Player of the Year est. 1994

== Bracket ==
First round	Second round
SE Missouri State	50
Dakota Wesleyan	30
SE Missouri State	56
Westminster	33
Westminster (MO)	48
Loyola Chicago	45*
TOP TIER
Eastern Washington State	54
Valparaiso	42
Eastern Washington State	54
St. Cloud State	41
St. Cloud State	59
Texas Wesleyan	54
Murray State	72
SW Missouri State	44
Murray State	44
Southwestern (KS)	42
Southwestern (KS)	70
Ouachita Baptist	36
TOP TIER
George Pepperdine	50
Kearney State	45
George Pepperdine	43
Luther	38
Luther	31
Southwestern State (OK)	29
York (NE)	52
Akron	49
York	49
North Texas State	51
North Texas State	60
Stout Institute	37
BOTTOM TIER
East Central State	53
South Dakota State	47
East Central State	39
Hamline	41
Hamline	65
Central (MO)	38
Kansas Wesleyan	43
Lawrence Tech	42
Kansas Wesleyan	40
Appalachian State	54
Appalachian State	48
Simpson	31
BOTTOM TIER
Eastern Oregon	45
Illinois Wesleyan	40
Eastern Oregon State	24
NW Missouri State	61
NW Missouri State	37
Indiana State	28

Elite Eight
SE Missouri State	57
Eastern Washington State	51
Murray State	44
George Pepperdine	38
North Texas State	45
Hamline	41
Appalachian State	34
NW Missouri State	46

NAIA national semifinals
SE Missouri State	38
Murray State	36
North Texas State	31
NW Missouri State	47

NAIA national championship
SE Missouri State	34
NW Missouri State	32
NAIA third-place game
Murray State	55*
North Texas State	59

- * denotes overtime.

== See also ==
- 1943 NCAA basketball tournament
- 1943 National Invitation Tournament
