= 1942 NAIA basketball tournament =

College basketball tournament

1942 NAIA men's basketball tournament
- Teams: 32
- Finals site: Municipal Auditorium; Kansas City, Missouri
- Champions: Hamline (1st title, 1st title game, 2nd Final Four)
- Runner-up: Southeastern State (1st title game, 1st Final Four)
- Semifinalists: Kansas State Teachers–Pittsburg (1st Final Four); Central Missouri State Teachers (3rd Final Four)
- MVP: Gus Doerner (Evansville)

The 1942 NAIA basketball tournament was held in March at Municipal Auditorium in Kansas City, Missouri. The 6th annual NAIA basketball tournament featured 32 teams playing in a single-elimination format.

The championship game featured Hamline beating Southeastern State (OK), 33–31.

== Awards and honors ==
Many of the records set by the 1942 tournament have been broken, and many of the awards were established much later:

- Leading scorer est. 1963
- Leading rebounder est. 1963
- Charles Stevenson Hustle Award est. 1958
- Coach of the Year est. 1954
- Player of the Year est. 1994

== Bracket ==
First round	Second round
Southeastern State	43
Eastern Washington State	33
Southeastern State	37
Texas Tech	36
Texas Tech	59
Louisiana Tech	47
TOP TIER
Evansville	73
Peru State	50
Evansville	30
East Central State	42
East Central State	49
Murray State	45*
Missouri Valley	68
George Pepperdine	53
Missouri Valley	49
Stout Institute	33
Stout Institute	47
Texas Wesleyan	42
TOP TIER
Luther	39
Delta State	35
Luther	39
Pittsburg State	48
Pittsburg State	37
Arkansas State Teachers	34
Southwestern (KS)	47
East Texas State	43
Southwestern (KS)	31
Hamline	37
Hamline	67
New Mexico Normal	40
BOTTOM TIER
Indiana State	83
Stevens Point State	45
Indiana State	51
Simpson	43
Simpson	59
Portland	43
San Diego State	36
Chadron State	29
San Diego State	32
Bemidji State	41
Bemidji State	46
Panzer	37
BOTTOM TIER
Central Missouri State	53
Morehead State	29
Central Missouri State	59
High Point	40
High Point	44
Yankton	37

Elite Eight
Southeastern State	46
East Central State	41*
Missouri Valley	49
Pittsburg State	59
Hamline	45
Indiana State	41
Bemidji State	32
Central Missouri State	46

NAIA national semifinals
Southeastern State	37
Pittsburg State	36
Hamline	45
Central Missouri State	27

NAIA national championship
Southeastern State	31
Hamline	33
NAIA third-place game
Pittsburg State	48
Central Missouri State	47

- * denotes overtime.

== See also ==
- 1942 NCAA basketball tournament
- 1942 National Invitation Tournament
