= Cal Luther =

American basketball player-coach (1927–2021)

Biographical details
- Born: October 23, 1927; Valdosta, Georgia, U.S.
- Died: May 8, 2021 (aged 93); Dresden, Tennessee, U.S.

Playing career
- 1949–1951: Valparaiso
- Position: Guard

Coaching career (HC unless noted)
- 1951–1954: Illinois (freshmen)
- 1954–1958: DePauw
- 1958–1974: Murray State
- 1981–1990: Longwood
- 1990–1999: UT Martin
- 1999–2000: Bethel (TN)

Administrative career (AD unless noted)
- 1967–1977: Murray State

Head coaching record
- Overall: 500–489–1

Accomplishments and honors

Championships
- ICC (1957); 2 OVC (1964, 1969)

Awards
- 3× OVC Coach of the Year (1964, 1969, 1996); Mason-Dixon Conference Coach of the Year (1988)

Calvin Charles Luther (October 23, 1927 – May 8, 2021) was an American men's college basketball coach. He was the head coach at DePauw, Murray State, Longwood, UT Martin, and Bethel College. He was also head coach of the Egyptian national team.

== Early life ==
Born in Valdosta, Georgia, Luther was an All-state football and basketball player at Bay View High School in Milwaukee. He played college basketball at Valparaiso from 1949 to 1951. He spent two years as a member of the 82nd Airborne Division and was a member of Fort Benning's basketball and championship-winning football teams.

Luther's coaching career began at the University of Illinois, where he spent three seasons as the freshman basketball while obtaining his master's degree.

== DePauw ==
Luther became DePauw University's head coach in 1954. In his first season as head coach, he coached DePauw to a rare tie against Wabash. DePauw defeated Wabash 67-66, however the coaches of both teams decided the game should be recorded as a tie due to a scorers error. In four seasons with the Tigers, Luther had a 45-40-1 record; including the 1956-57 ICC Championship and a berth in the inaugural NCAA College Division Tourney. He coached two of DePauw's 1,000 point scorers (#6 Bob Schrier - 1,415 and #22 John Bunnell 1,004)

== Murray State ==
In 1958, Luther became Murray State's seventh head basketball coach. In his sixteen seasons at MSU, Luther's Racers had a 241–134 record and made the NCAA tournament twice. He was also Murray State's Athletic Director. He was named OVC Coach of the Year in 1964 and 1969. In 1971, the Minnesota Golden Gophers hired Luther to coach the men's basketball team, but he changed his mind and turned the team down after accepting the position. He stepped down as head coach in 1974 to become the school's full-time athletic director. He resigned as AD in 1977 at the behest of the university president, Dr. Constantine W. Curris.

== Longwood ==
Luther spent nine seasons as the head coach of Division II Longwood University, where he was selected Mason-Dixon Conference and Kodak Division II South District coach of the year in 1988. One of his players, Jerome Kersey, would be drafted in the second round of the 1984 NBA draft. His overall record at Longwood was 136–105.

== Egypt ==
Luther was the coach of the Egyptian national basketball team in 1990. Egypt finished 16th out of 16 teams in the 1990 FIBA World Championship.

== Tennessee-Martin ==
Luther coached Tennessee-Martin from 1990-1999. There he compiled a 72–163 record. His 319 total victories while a coach in the OVC ranks first all-time in league history. Luther was named OVC Coach of the Year in 1996, making him the only coach to win Coach of the Year honors at two different OVC institutions. After leaving UT Martin, Luther spent one season as the coach of Bethel College before retiring.

== Death ==
Luther died on May 8, 2021, at Hillview Nursing Center in Dresden, TN. His was married to Linda Wren Luther.

== Head coaching record ==
Record table
Season	Team	Overall	Conference	Standing	Postseason
DePauw Tigers (Indiana Collegiate Conference) (1954–1958)
1954–55	DePauw	8–11–1			
1955–56	DePauw	13–8			
1956–57	DePauw	12–9			
1957–58	DePauw	12–12			
DePauw:		45–40–1 (.529)			
Murray State Racers (Ohio Valley Conference) (1958–1974)
1958–59	Murray State	10–15	3–9	7th	
1959–60	Murray State	12–11	7–4	3rd	
1960–61	Murray State	13–10	7–5	4th	
1961–62	Murray State	13–12	5–7	5th	
1962–63	Murray State	13–9	6–6	4th	
1963–64	Murray State	16–9	11–3	1st	NCAA University Division Round of 25
1964–65	Murray State	19–7	9–5	3rd	
1965–66	Murray State	13–12	8–6	3rd	
1966–67	Murray State	14–9	8–6	2nd	
1967–68	Murray State	16–8	10–4	T–1st	
1968–69	Murray State	22–6	11–3	T–1st	NCAA University Division Round of 25
1969–70	Murray State	17–9	9–5	2nd	
1970–71	Murray State	19–5	10–4	2nd	
1971–72	Murray State	15–11	6–8	5th	
1972–73	Murray State	17–8	9–5	2nd	
1973–74	Murray State	12–13	6–8	5th	
1974–75	Murray State	10–15	3–11	7th	
Murray State:		241–154 (.610)	125–88 (.587)		
Longwood (NCAA Division II independent) (1981–1983)
1981–82	Longwood	15–8			
1982–83	Longwood	15–10			
Longwood Lancers (Mason–Dixon Conference) (1983–1988)
1983–84	Longwood	15–12	7–3	2nd	
1984–85	Longwood	11–17	3–7	4th	
1985–86	Longwood	14–13	7–3	2nd	
1986–87	Longwood	13–14	3–5	3rd	
1987–88	Longwood	19–10	6–2	T–1st	
Longwood Lancers (NCAA Division II independent) (1988–1990)
1988–89	Longwood	20–7			
1989–90	Longwood	14–14			
Longwood:		136–105 (.564)	26–20 (.565)		
UT Martin (Gulf South Conference) (1990–1991)
1990–91	UT Martin	5–15	2–14		
UT Martin (Ohio Valley Conference) (1991–1999)
1991–92	UT Martin	9–19			
1992–93	UT Martin	7–19	4–12	T–8th	
1993–94	UT Martin	5–22	3–13	9th	
1994–95	UT Martin	7–20	5–11	9th	
1995–96	UT Martin	13–14	9–7	T–4th	
1996–97	UT Martin	11–16	8–10	7th	
1997–98	UT Martin	7–20	5–13	T–8th	
1998–99	UT Martin	8–18	5–13	9th	
UT Martin:		72–163 (.306)	39–79 (.331)		
Bethel Wildcats (Kentucky Intercollegiate Athletic Conference) (1999–2000)
1999–00	Bethel	6–27			
Bethel:		6–27 (.182)			
Total:		500–489–1 (.506)			
National champion Postseason invitational champion Conference regular season champion Conference regular season and conference tournament champion Division regular season champion Division regular season and conference tournament champion Conference tournament champion
