= List of Ohio Valley Conference men's basketball champions =

Ohio Valley Conference men's basketball tournament
- Sport: College basketball
- Conference: Ohio Valley Conference
- Number of teams: 12
- Format: Single-elimination tournament
- Current stadium: Ford Center
- Current location: Evansville, Indiana
- Played: 1949–1955; 1964–1967; 1975–present
- Last contest: 2026
- Current champion: Tennessee State
- Most championships: Murray State Racers (18)
- TV partner(s): ESPN2, ESPNU
- Official website: ovcsports.com/sports/mbball

This is a list of regular season and tournament champions in men's basketball of the NCAA Division I Ohio Valley Conference.

== Men's basketball conference champions ==
The Ohio Valley Conference basketball tournament was held in Louisville from 1949–55 and from 1964 to 1967. The tournaments held from 1948 to 1967 were done at the beginning of the season rather than after conference play. From 1956 to 1963 and from 1968 to 1974, no tournament was held. From 1975 to 1991, the tournament was held at the arena of the team that finished atop the conference standings. It has been held at a neutral site since 1992.

Season	Regular season champion	Tournament champion	Score	Tournament runner-up	Venue	City
1949	Western Kentucky (8–2)	Western Kentucky	74–68	Louisville	Jefferson County Armory	Louisville, Kentucky
1950	Western Kentucky (8–0)	Eastern Kentucky	62–50	Western Kentucky	Jefferson County Armory	Louisville, Kentucky
1951	Murray State (9–3)	Murray State	92–50	Eastern Kentucky	Jefferson County Armory	Louisville, Kentucky
1952	Western Kentucky (9–1)	Western Kentucky	47–45	Murray State	Jefferson County Armory	Louisville, Kentucky
1953	Eastern Kentucky (9–1)	Western Kentucky	70–60	Eastern Kentucky	Jefferson County Armory	Louisville, Kentucky
1954	Western Kentucky (9–1)	Western Kentucky	85–69	Eastern Kentucky	Jefferson County Armory	Louisville, Kentucky
1955	Western Kentucky (8–2)	Eastern Kentucky	76–59	Murray State	Jefferson County Armory	Louisville, Kentucky
1956	Morehead State/Tennessee Tech/Western Kentucky (7–3)	None	None	None	None	None
1957	Morehead State/Western Kentucky (9–1)	None	None	None	None	None
1958	Tennessee Tech (8–2)	None	None	None	None	None
1959	Eastern Kentucky (10–2)	None	None	None	None	None
1960	Western Kentucky (10–2)	None	None	None	None	None
1961	Morehead State/Western Kentucky/Eastern Kentucky (9–3)	None	None	None	None	None
1962	Western Kentucky (11–1)	None	None	None	None	None
1963	Tennessee Tech/Morehead State (8–4)	None	None	None	None	None
1964	Murray State (11–3)	Murray State	77–68	Western Kentucky	Jefferson County Armory	Louisville, Kentucky
1965	Eastern Kentucky (13–1)	Western Kentucky	83–67	Eastern Kentucky	Jefferson County Armory	Louisville, Kentucky
1966	Western Kentucky (14–0)	Western Kentucky	72–59	East Tennessee	Jefferson County Armory	Louisville, Kentucky
1967	Western Kentucky (13–1)	Tennessee Tech	67–60	Murray State	Jefferson County Armory	Louisville, Kentucky
1968	East Tennessee/Murray St (11–3)	None	None	None		
1969	Murray State/Morehead State (11–3)	None	None	None		
1970	Western Kentucky (14–0)	None	None	None		
1971	Western Kentucky (12–2)	None	None	None		
1972	Eastern Kentucky/Morehead State/Western Kentucky (9–5)	None	None	None		
1973	Austin Peay (11–3)	None	None	None		
1974	Austin Peay/Morehead State (10–4)	None	None	None		
1975	Middle Tennessee (12–2)	Middle Tennessee	89–75	Austin Peay	Murphy Center	Murfreesboro, Tennessee
1976	Western Kentucky (11–3)	Western Kentucky	65–60	Morehead State	E.A. Diddle Arena	Bowling Green, Kentucky
1977	Austin Peay (13–1)	Middle Tennessee	77–65	Austin Peay	Dunn Center	Clarksville, Tennessee
1978	Middle Tennessee/East Tennessee (10–4)	Western Kentucky	77–69	Austin Peay	E. A. Diddle Arena	Bowling Green, Kentucky
1979	Eastern Kentucky (9–3)	Eastern Kentucky	78–77	Western Kentucky	McBrayer Arena	Richmond, Kentucky
1980	Western Kentucky/Murray St (10–2)	Western Kentucky	54–51	Murray State	E. A. Diddle Arena	Bowling Green, Kentucky
1981	Western Kentucky (12–2)	Western Kentucky	71–67	Murray State	E. A. Diddle Arena	Bowling Green, Kentucky
1982	Murray State/Western Kentucky (13–3)	Middle Tennessee	54–52	Western Kentucky	E. A. Diddle Arena	Bowling Green, Kentucky
1983	Murray State (11–3)	Morehead State	81–65	Akron	Racer Arena	Murray, Kentucky
1984	Morehead State (12–2)	Morehead State	47–44	Youngstown State	Ellis Johnson Arena	Morehead, Kentucky
1985	Tennessee Tech (11–3)	Middle Tennessee	66–63	Youngstown State	Murphy Center	Murfreesboro, Tennessee
1986	Akron/Middle Tennessee (10–4)	Akron	68–63	Middle Tennessee	James A. Rhodes Arena	Akron, Ohio
1987	Middle Tennessee (11–3)	Austin Peay	71–68	Eastern Kentucky	Murphy Center	Murfreesboro, Tennessee
1988	Murray State (13–1)	Murray State	73–70	Austin Peay	Racer Arena	Murray, Kentucky
1989	Middle Tennessee/Murray St (10–2)	Middle Tennessee	82–79	Austin Peay	First round at campus locations; rest at Nashville Municipal Auditorium	Nashville, Tennessee
1990	Murray State (10–2)	Murray State	73–67	Eastern Kentucky	Racer Arena	Murray, Kentucky
1991	Murray State (10–2)	Murray State	79–67	Middle Tennessee	Racer Arena	Murray, Kentucky
1992	Murray State (11–3)	Murray State	81–60	Eastern Kentucky	Rupp Arena	Lexington, Kentucky
1993	Tennessee State (13–3)	Tennessee State	82–68	Murray State	Rupp Arena	Lexington, Kentucky
1994	Murray State (15–1)	Tennessee State	73–72	Murray State	Nashville Municipal Auditorium	Nashville, Tennessee
1995	Murray State/Tennessee State (11–5)	Murray State	92–84	Austin Peay	Nashville Municipal Auditorium	Nashville, Tennessee
1996	Murray State (12–4)	Austin Peay	70–68	Murray State	Nashville Municipal Auditorium	Nashville, Tennessee
1997	Murray State/Austin Peay (12–6)	Murray State	88–85 (OT)	Austin Peay	Gaylord Entertainment Center	Nashville, Tennessee
1998	Murray State (16–2)	Murray State	92–69	Tennessee State	Gaylord Entertainment Center	Nashville, Tennessee
1999	Murray State (16–2)	Murray State	62–61	Southeast Missouri State	Gaylord Entertainment Center	Nashville, Tennessee
2000	Southeast Missouri/Murray St (14–4)	Southeast Missouri	67–56	Murray State	Gaylord Entertainment Center	Nashville, Tennessee
2001	Tennessee Tech (13–3)	Eastern Illinois	84–83	Austin Peay	Gaylord Entertainment Center	Nashville, Tennessee
2002	Tennessee Tech (15–1)	Murray State	70–69	Tennessee Tech	Commonwealth Convention Center	Louisville, Kentucky
2003	Austin Peay/Morehead State (13–3)	Austin Peay	63–57	Tennessee Tech	Gaylord Entertainment Center	Nashville, Tennessee
2004	Austin Peay (16–0)	Murray State	66–60	Austin Peay	Nashville Municipal Auditorium	Nashville, Tennessee
2005	Tennessee Tech (12–4)	Eastern Kentucky	52–46	Austin Peay	Gaylord Entertainment Center	Nashville, Tennessee
2006	Murray State (17–3)	Murray State	74–57	Samford	First round games at campus sites; rest at Gaylord Entertainment Center	Nashville, Tennessee
2007	Austin Peay (16–4)	Eastern Kentucky	63–62	Austin Peay	First round games at campus sites; rest at Gaylord Entertainment Center	Nashville, Tennessee
2008	Austin Peay (16–4)	Austin Peay	82–64	Tennessee State	First round games at campus sites; rest at Nashville Municipal Auditorium	Nashville, Tennessee
2009	Tennessee Martin (14–4)	Morehead State	67–65 (2OT)	Austin Peay	First round games at campus sites; rest at Sommet Center	Nashville, Tennessee
2010	Murray State (17–1)	Murray State	62–51	Morehead State	First round games at campus sites; rest at Sommet Center	Nashville, Tennessee
2011	Murray State (14–4)	Morehead State	80–73	Tennessee Tech	Nashville Municipal Auditorium	Nashville, Tennessee
2012	Murray State (15–1)	Murray State	54–52	Tennessee State	Nashville Municipal Auditorium	Nashville, Tennessee
2013	East: Belmont (14–2); West: Murray State (10–6)	Belmont	70–68 (OT)	Murray State	Nashville Municipal Auditorium	Nashville, Tennessee
2014	East: Belmont (14–2); West: Murray State (13–3)	Eastern Kentucky	79–73	Belmont	Nashville Municipal Auditorium	Nashville, Tennessee
2015	East: Belmont (11–5); West: Murray State (16–0)	Belmont	88–87	Murray State	Nashville Municipal Auditorium	Nashville, Tennessee
2016	East: Belmont (12–4); West: Tennessee-Martin (10–6)	Austin Peay	83–73	Tennessee–Martin	Nashville Municipal Auditorium	Nashville, Tennessee
2017	East: Belmont (15–1); West: Tennessee-Martin (10–6)	Jacksonville State	66–55	UT Martin	Nashville Municipal Auditorium	Nashville, Tennessee
2018	Murray State (15–2)	Murray State	68–51	Belmont	Ford Center	Evansville, Indiana
2019	Belmont/Murray State (16–2)	Murray State	77–65	Belmont	Ford Center	Evansville, Indiana
2020	Belmont/Murray State (15–3)	Belmont	76–75	Murray State	Ford Center	Evansville, Indiana
2021	Belmont (18–2)	Morehead State	86–71	Belmont	Ford Center	Evansville, Indiana
2022	Murray State (18–0)	Murray State	71–67	Morehead State	Ford Center	Evansville, Indiana
2023	Morehead State (14–4)	Southeast Missouri	89–82 (OT)	Tennessee Tech	Ford Center	Evansville, Indiana
2024	Little Rock/Tennessee Martin/Morehead State (14–4)	Morehead State	69–55	Little Rock	Ford Center	Evansville, Indiana
2025	Southeast Missouri State (15–5)	SIU Edwardsville	69–48	Southeast Missouri State	Ford Center	Evansville, Indiana
2026	Morehead State/Tennessee State (15–5)	Tennessee State	93–67	Morehead State	Ford Center	Evansville, Indiana

== Tournament championships by school ==
Schools highlighted in pink are former members of the Ohio Valley Conference. Tournament Championships are indicated in bold.

School	Number of Tournament Championships	Last Tournament Championship	Final Appearances (since 1975)
Murray State	18	2022	1980, 1981, **1988**, **1990**, **1991**, **1992**, 1993, 1994, **1995**, 1996, **1997**, **1998**, **1999**, 2000, **2002**, **2004**, **2006**, **2010**, **2012**, 2013, 2015, **2018**, **2019**, 2020, **2022**
Western Kentucky	10	1981	**1976**, **1978**, 1979, **1980**, **1981**, 1982
Eastern Kentucky	6	2014	**1979**, 1987, 1990, 1992, **2005**, **2007**, **2014**
Morehead State	6	2024	1976, **1983**, **1984**, **2009**, 2010, **2011**, **2021**, 2022, **2024**, 2026
Middle Tennessee	5	1989	**1975**, **1977**, **1982**, **1985**, 1986, **1989**, 1991
Austin Peay	5	2016	1975, 1977, 1978, **1987**, 1988, 1989, 1995, **1996**, 1997, 2001, **2003**, 2004, 2005, 2007, **2008**, 2009, **2016**
Belmont	3	2020	**2013**, 2014, **2015**, 2018, 2019, **2020**, 2021
Tennessee State	3	2026	**1993**, **1994**, 1998, 2008, 2012, **2026**
Southeast Missouri	2	2023	1999, **2000**, **2023**, 2025
Tennessee Tech	1	1967	2002, 2003, 2011, 2023
Akron	1	1986	1983, **1986**
Eastern Illinois	1	2001	**2001**
Jacksonville State	1	2017	**2017**
SIU Edwardsville	1	2025	**2025**
UT Martin	0	–	2016, 2017
Little Rock	0	–	2024
Samford	0	–	2006
Youngstown State	0	–	1984, 1985

Currently, Lindenwood, Western Illinois, Southern Indiana have never appeared in an OVC Tournament Final or won the conference championship.

== NCAA Tournament Appearances ==
Year	OVC Team	Opponent	Result
1953	Eastern Kentucky	Notre Dame	L 57–72
1956	Morehead State	Marshall; Iowa; Wayne State	W 107–92; L 83–97; W 95–84 (Note: Regional third-place game)
1957	Morehead State	Pittsburgh	L 85–86
1958	Tennessee Tech	Notre Dame	L 61–94
1959	Eastern Kentucky	Louisville	L 63–77
1960	Western Kentucky	Miami (FL); Ohio State; Ohio	W 107–84; L 79–98; W 97–87
1961	Morehead State	Xavier; Kentucky; Louisville	W 71–66; L 64–71; L 61–83
1962	Western Kentucky	Detroit; Ohio State; Butler	W 90–81; L 73–93; L 86–87^{OT}
1963	Tennessee Tech	Loyola–Chicago	L 42–111
1964	Murray State	Loyola–Chicago	L 91–101
1965	Eastern Kentucky	DePaul	L 52–99
1966	Western Kentucky	Loyola–Chicago; Michigan; Dayton	W 105–86; L 79–80; W 82–62
1967	Western Kentucky	Dayton	L 67–69^{OT}
1968	East Tennessee State	Florida; Ohio State; Marquette	W 79–69; L 72–79; L 57–69
1969	Murray State	Marquette	L 62–82
1970	Western Kentucky	Jacksonville	L 96–109
1971	Western Kentucky	Jacksonville; Kentucky; Ohio State; Villanova; Kansas	W 74–72; W 107–83; W 81–78^{OT} L 89–92^{2OT} W 77–75 (Note: National third-place game)
1972	Eastern Kentucky	Florida State	L 81–83
1973	Austin Peay	Jacksonville; Kentucky; Marquette	W 77–75; L 100–106^{OT} L 73–88
1974	Austin Peay	Notre Dame	L 66–108
1975	Middle Tennessee	Oregon State	L 67–78
1976	Western Kentucky	Marquette	L 60–79
1977	Middle Tennessee	Detroit	L 76–93
1978	Western Kentucky	Syracuse; Michigan State	W 87–86^{OT} L 69–90
1979	(9) Eastern Kentucky	(8) Tennessee	L 81–97
1980	(10) Western Kentucky	(7) Virginia Tech	L 85–89^{OT}
1981	(10) Western Kentucky	(7) UAB	L 68–93
1982	(11) Middle Tennessee	(6) Kentucky (3) Louisville	W 50–44; L 56–81
1983	(6) Morehead State	(6) Syracuse	L 59–74
1984	(12) Morehead State	(12) North Carolina A&T (5) Louisville	W 70–69; L 59–72
1985	(15) Middle Tennessee	(2) North Carolina	L 57–76
1986	(15) Akron	(2) Michigan	L 64–70
1987	(14) Austin Peay	(3) Illinois (6) Providence	W 68–67; L 87–90^{OT}
1987	(12) Middle Tennessee	(5) Notre Dame	L 71–84
1988	(14) Murray State	(3) North Carolina State (6) Kansas	W 78–75; L 58–61
1989	(13) Middle Tennessee	(4) Florida State (5) Virginia	W 97–83; L 88–104
1990	(16) Murray State	(1) Michigan State	L 71–75^{OT}
1991	(13) Murray State	(4) Alabama	L 79–89
1992	(14) Murray State	(3) Arkansas	L 69–80
1993	(15) Tennessee State	(2) Seton Hall	L 59–81
1994	(14) Tennessee State	(3) Kentucky	L 70–83
1995	(15) Murray State	(2) North Carolina	L 70–80
1996	(14) Austin Peay	(3) Georgia Tech	L 79–90
1997	(15) Murray State	(2) Duke	L 68–71
1998	(9) Murray State	(8) Rhode Island	L 74–97
1999	(13) Murray State	(4) Ohio State	L 58–72
2000	(13) Southeast Missouri	(4) LSU	L 61–64
2001	(15) Eastern Illinois	(2) Arizona	L 76–101
2002	(14) Murray State	(3) Georgia	L 68–85
2003	(13) Austin Peay	(4) Louisville	L 64–86
2004	(12) Murray State	(5) Illinois	L 53–72
2005	(15) Eastern Kentucky	(2) Kentucky	L 64–72
2006	(14) Murray State	(3) North Carolina	L 65–69
2007	(16) Eastern Kentucky	(1) North Carolina	L 65–86
2008	(15) Austin Peay	(2) Texas	L 54–74
2009	(16) Morehead State	(16) Alabama State (1) Louisville	W 58–43; L 54–74
2010	(13) Murray State	(4) Vanderbilt (5) Butler	W 66–65; L 52–54
2011	(13) Morehead State	(4) Louisville (12) Richmond	W 62–61; L 48–65
2012	(6) Murray State	(11) Colorado State (3) Marquette	W 58–41; L 53–62
2013	(11) Belmont	(6) Arizona	L 64–81
2014	(15) Eastern Kentucky	(2) Kansas	L 69–80
2015	(15) Belmont	(2) Virginia	L 67–79
2016	(16) Austin Peay	(1) Kansas	L 79–105
2017	(15) Jacksonville State	(2) Louisville	L 63–78
2018	(12) Murray State	(5) West Virginia	L 68–85
2019	(11) Belmont	(11) Temple (6) Maryland	W 81–70; L 77–79
2019	(12) Murray State	(5) Marquette (4) Florida State	W 83–64; L 62–90
2021	(14) Morehead State	(3) West Virginia	L 67–84
2022	(7) Murray State	(10) San Francisco (15) Saint Peter’s	W 92–87^{OT} L 60–70
2023	(16) Southeast Missouri	(16) Texas A&M–Corpus Christi	L 71–75
2024	(14) Morehead State	(3) Illinois	L 69–85
2025	(16) SIUE	(1) Houston	L 40–78
2026	(15) Tennessee State	(2) Iowa State	L 74–108

- 2020 NCAA tournament was canceled due to COVID-19.

== See also ==
- Ohio Valley Conference women's basketball tournament
