= Middle Tennessee Blue Raiders men's basketball statistical leaders =

The Middle Tennessee Blue Raiders men's basketball statistical leaders are individual statistical leaders of the Middle Tennessee Blue Raiders men's basketball program in various categories, including points, rebounds, assists, steals, and blocks. Within those areas, the lists identify single-game, single-season, and career leaders. The Blue Raiders represent Middle Tennessee State University in the NCAA's Conference USA.

Middle Tennessee began competing in intercollegiate basketball in 1913. However, the school's record book does not generally list records from before the 1950s, as records from before this period are often incomplete and inconsistent. Since scoring was much lower in this era, and teams played much fewer games during a typical season, it is likely that few or no players from this era would appear on these lists anyway.

The NCAA did not officially record assists as a stat until the 1983–84 season, and blocks and steals until the 1985–86 season, but Middle Tennessee's record books includes players in these stats before these seasons. These lists are updated through the end of the 2020–21 season.

== Scoring ==
Career
Rk	Player	Points	Seasons
1	Desmond Yates	1,775	2006–07 2007–08 2008–09 2009–10
2	Giddy Potts	1,645	2014–15 2015–16 2016–17 2017–18
3	Robert Taylor	1,622	1989–90 1990–91 1991–92 1992–93
4	Kerry Hammonds	1,616	1984–85 1985–86 1986–87 1988–89
5	Reggie Upshaw	1,571	2013–14 2014–15 2015–16 2016–17
6	Tommy Gunn	1,528	2000–01 2001–02 2002–03 2003–04
7	Willie Brown	1,524	1966–67 1967–68 1968–69
8	Randy Henry	1,484	1985–86 1986–87 1987–88 1988–89
9	Ken Trickey	1,456	1951–52 1952–53 1953–54 1954–55
10	Tim Sisneros	1,426	1972–73 1973–74 1974–75 1975–76
	Chris Rainey	1,426	1986–87 1987–88 1988–89

Season
Rk	Player	Points	Season
1	Nick King	694	2017–18
2	Kim Cooksey	623	1985–86
3	JaCorey Williams	621	2016–17
4	Tim Sisneros	618	1975–76
5	Willie Brown	605	1968–69
6	Randy Henry	604	1988–89
7	Milton Dean	597	1993–94
8	Chris Rainey	580	1988–89
9	Antonio Green	573	2018–19
10	Chris Rainey	565	1987–88

Single game
Rk	Player	Points	Season	Opponent
1	Mike Milholland	44	1964–65	Austin Peay
2	Bob Burden	43	1959–60	Lipscomb
3	Milton Dean	41	1993–94	SE Missouri
	Jestin Porter	41	2023–24	UTEP
5	Bob Gardner	39	1966–67	Chattanooga
6	Willie Brown	38	1967–68	Austin Peay
	Willie Brown	38	1968–69	East Tennessee
	Willie Brown	38	1967–68	Chattanooga
9	Robert Taylor	37	1990–91	Austin Peay
	Tim Sisneros	37	1975–76	Marshall

== Rebounds ==
Career
Rk	Player	Rebounds	Seasons
1	Warren Kidd	1,048	1990–91 1991–92 1992–93
2	Kerry Hammonds	955	1984–85 1985–86 1986–87 1988–89
3	Ken Riley	924	1967–68 1969–70 1970–71
4	Reggie Upshaw	910	2013–14 2014–15 2015–16 2016–17
5	Tim Sisneros	846	1972–73 1973–74 1974–75 1975–76
6	Jerry Beck	782	1978–79 1979–80 1980–81 1981–82
7	Bennett Jent	745	1960–61 1961–62 1962–63
8	Render Carden	728	1953–54 1954–55 1955–56
9	Dwayne Rainey	723	1985–86 1986–87 1987–88
10	Chris Harris	707	1978–79 1979–80 1980–81 1981–82

Season
Rk	Player	Rebounds	Season
1	Booker Brown	429	1968–69
2	Warren Kidd	386	1992–93
3	George Sorrell	373	1974–75
4	Warren Kidd	370	1990–91
5	Ken Riley	338	1967–68
6	Bennett Jent	330	1962–63
7	Kerry Hammonds	319	1988–89
8	Jerry Hurst	316	1956–57
	Ed Cannon	316	1965–66
10	Dwayne Rainey	312	1987–88

Single game
Rk	Player	Rebounds	Season	Opponent
1	Mike Milholland	32	1964–65	Austin Peay
2	Bennett Jent	31	1962–63	Tennessee Tech
3	Booker Brown	30	1968–69	Austin Peay
4	Bennett Jent	29	1962–63	Huntingdon
	Booker Brown	29	1968–69	UT Martin
6	Booker Brown	25	1968–69	Oral Roberts
7	Jerry Hurst	24	1957–58	Lipscomb
8	Booker Brown	23	1968–69	Athens
	Ed Cannon	23	1964–65	Parsons
	Jerry Hurst	23	1957–58	Eastern Kentucky
	Render Carden	23	1954–55	Austin Peay

== Assists ==
Career
Rk	Player	Assists	Seasons
1	Kevin Kanaskie	485	2005–06 2006–07 2007–08 2008–09
2	Gerald Harris	463	1986–87 1987–88 1988–89 1989–90
3	Duane Washington	452	1985–86 1986–87
4	Richard Duncan	399	1996–97 1997–98 1998–99
5	Donovan Sims	350	2017–18 2018–19 2019–20 2020–21 2021–22
6	Tim Gaither	342	1992–93 1993–94 1994–95 1995–96
7	Chris Rainey	326	1986–87 1987–88 1988–89
8	Camryn Weston	317	2021–22 2022–23 2023–24 2024–25
9	James Johnson	313	1984–85 1985–86
10	Pancakes Perry	303	1979–80 1980–81 1981–82 1982–83

Season
Rk	Player	Assists	Season
1	Duane Washington	255	1986–87
2	Gerald Harris	207	1988–89
3	Duane Washington	197	1985–86
4	James Johnson	192	1985–86
5	Kevin Kanaskie	185	2006–07
6	Tweety Knight	152	2013–14
7	Chris Rainey	149	1987–88
8	Lewis Mack	144	1976–77
9	Gerald Harris	143	1989–90
10	Richard Duncan	142	1998–99

Single game
Rk	Player	Assists	Season	Opponent
1	James Johnson	20	1985–86	Freed-Hardeman
2	Duane Washington	16	1986–87	Eastern Kentucky
	Duane Washington	16	1985–86	Morehead State
4	Duane Washington	15	1986–87	Tennessee Tech
5	Camryn Weston	14	2024–25	UTEP
	Greg Christian	14	1990–91	Kennesaw State
	Lewis Mack	14	1976–77	Little Rock
8	Kevin Kanaskie	13	2006–07	Louisiana
	Duane Washington	13	1985–86	Alabama State
	Gerald Harris	13	1988–89	Austin Peay
	James Johnson	13	1985–86	Armstrong State
	James Johnson	13	1984–85	Clemson

== Steals ==
Career
Rk	Player	Steals	Seasons
1	Richard Duncan	190	1996–97 1997–98 1998–99
2	Tommy Gunn	156	2000–01 2001–02 2002–03 2003–04
	Donovan Sims	156	2017–18 2018–19 2019–20 2020–21 2021–22
4	Reggie Upshaw	151	2013–14 2014–15 2015–16 2016–17
5	Giddy Potts	148	2014–15 2015–16 2016–17 2017–18
6	Tim Gaither	145	1992–93 1993–94 1994–95 1995–96
7	Gerald Harris	139	1986–87 1987–88 1988–89 1989–90
8	James Johnson	136	1984–85 1985–86
9	Duane Washington	134	1985–86 1986–87
10	Kevin Kanaskie	127	2005–06 2006–07 2007–08 2008–09
	Camryn Weston	127	2021–22 2022–23 2023–24 2024–25

Season
Rk	Player	Steals	Season
1	Duane Washington	93	1986–87
2	Richard Duncan	87	1998–99
3	James Johnson	73	1985–86
4	Tweety Knight	66	2013–14
5	James Johnson	63	1984–85
6	Fernando Ortiz	60	1999–00
7	Richard Duncan	54	1997–98
	Bruce Massey	54	2011–12
9	Teafale Lenard	53	2022–23
10	James Washington	52	2010–11
	Tim Gaither	52	1993–94

Single game
Rk	Player	Steals	Season	Opponent
1	Richard Duncan	12	1998–99	Eastern Kentucky
2	Roni Bailey	9	1996–97	Montreat
3	Duane Washington	8	1986–87	Tennessee Tech
	Duane Washington	8	1986–87	Eastern Kentucky
	James Johnson	8	1985–86	South Carolina
6	James Johnson	7	1984–85	Murray State
	Richard Duncan	7	1998–99	UT Martin

== Blocks ==
Career
Rk	Player	Blocks	Seasons
1	Warren Kidd	185	1990–91 1991–92 1992–93
2	Lee Nosse	166	1997–98 1998–99 1999–00 2000–01 2001–02
3	Shawn Jones	158	2010–11 2011–12 2012–13 2013–14
4	Teafale Lenard	118	2021–22 2022–23
5	Reggie Upshaw	110	2013–14 2014–15 2015–16 2016–17
6	Chris Loofe	100	2023–24 2024–25 2025-26
7	Justin Bufford	90	2021–22 2022–23 2023–24 2024–25
8	Chris Ingram	81	1987–88 1988–89 1989–90 1990–91
9	Trevor Ottley	79	2009–10 2010–11
10	Theryn Hudson	69	2005–06 2006–07 2007–08 2008–09 2009–10
	Torey Alston	69	2024–25 2025-26

Season
Rk	Player	Blocks	Season
1	Warren Kidd	70	1990–91
2	Shawn Jones	63	2013–14
3	Warren Kidd	62	1991–92
4	Teafale Lenard	61	2022–23
5	Teafale Lenard	57	2021–22
6	Lee Nosse	55	1998–99
7	Warren Kidd	53	1992–93
8	LaRon Dendy	48	2011–12
9	Lee Nosse	45	2001–02
10	Shawn Jones	43	2012–13

Single game
Rk	Player	Blocks	Season	Opponent
1	Alex Weekes	8	2003–04	WKU
2	Warren Kidd	7	1991–92	Tennessee State
	Warren Kidd	7	1991–92	Austin Peay
4	Shawn Jones	6	2012–13	South Alabama
	Lee Nosse	6	1999–00	Southeast Missouri
	Lee Nosse	6	1998–99	Eastern Kentucky
	Lee Nosse	6	1998–99	Morehead State
	Lee Nosse	6	2001–02	Little Rock
	Quincy Vance	6	1989–90	Morehead State
	Warren Kidd	6	1991–92	Morehead State
	Warren Kidd	6	1990–91	South Carolina State
	Warren Kidd	6	1990–91	Kennesaw State
	Shawn Jones	6	2013–14	Tulane
	Teafale Lenard	6	2022–23	Belmont
	Torey Alston	6	2025–26	Kennesaw State
