= Clem Haskins =

American basketball player and coach

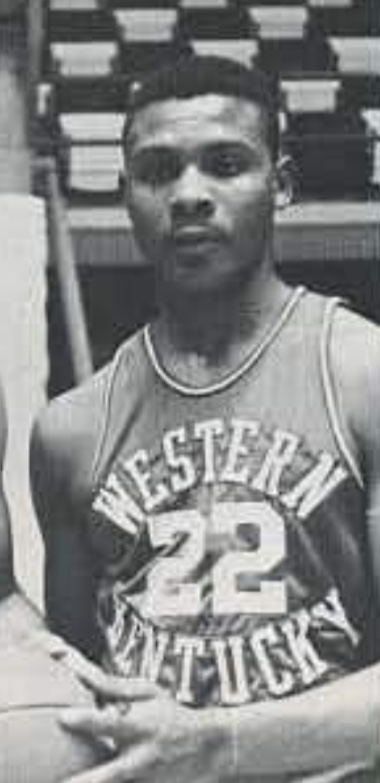
- Haskins as a senior at WKU

Personal information
- Born: July 11, 1943 (age 83) Campbellsville, Kentucky, U.S.
- Listed height: 6 ft 3 in (1.91 m)
- Listed weight: 195 lb (88 kg)

Career information
- High school: Taylor County (Campbellsville, Kentucky)
- College: Western Kentucky (1964–1967)
- NBA draft: 1967: 1st round, 3rd overall pick
- Drafted by: Chicago Bulls
- Playing career: 1967–1976
- Position: Point guard
- Number: 11, 14
- Coaching career: 1977–1999

Career history

Playing
- 1967–1970: Chicago Bulls
- 1970–1974: Phoenix Suns
- 1974–1976: Washington Bullets

Coaching
- 1977–1980: Western Kentucky (assistant)
- 1980–1986: Western Kentucky
- 1986–1999: Minnesota

Career highlights
- As player: Consensus first-team All-American (1967); 3× OVC Player of the Year (1965–1967); No. 22 jersey retired by Western Kentucky Hilltoppers; As coach: NCAA Division I Regional – Final Four (1997*); 2x NIT champion (1993, 1998*); OVC tournament champion (1981); 2× OVC regular season champion (1981, 1982); Big Ten regular season champion (1997*); AP Coach of the Year (1997*); Henry Iba Award (1997*); NABC Coach of the Year (1997*); Clair Bee Coach of the Year Award (1997*); OVC Coach of the Year (1981); Sun Belt Coach of the Year (1986); Big Ten Coach of the Year (1997*); * Vacated by the NCAA or Big Ten

Career NBA statistics
- Points: 8,743 (12.8 ppg)
- Rebounds: 2,087 (3.1 rpg)
- Assists: 2,382 (3.5 apg)
- Stats at NBA.com
- Stats at Basketball Reference
Medals
Assistant coach for United States
men's national basketball team
Olympic Games
Gold medal – first place	1996 Atlanta	Team

Clem Smith Haskins (born July 11, 1943) is an American former college and professional basketball player and college basketball coach. In the fall of 1963, he and fellow star player Dwight Smith became the first black athletes to integrate the Western Kentucky University (WKU) basketball program. This put Western Kentucky at the forefront to integrate college basketball in the South.

Haskins served 13 years (1986–1999) as head coach of the University of Minnesota's men's basketball team, but was forced to resign due to his part in the University of Minnesota basketball scandal. Due to his actions in the scandal, he was given a seven-year show-cause penalty which effectively ended his coaching career.

== Early life ==
Haskins was born and grew up in Campbellsville, Kentucky, the county seat. He is the fifth of eleven children of Charles Columbus and Lucy Edna Haskins, who were sharecroppers. During his freshman and sophomore seasons, he attended the all-black Durham High School (public schools were frequently in those years still segregated in the South, years after the practice was declared illegal). In 1961 Haskins attended Taylor County High School, the first African American to do so in the previously segregated system. His younger brother, Merion, was a standout player at the University of Kentucky, graduating in 1977.

== College career ==
Haskins and teammate Dwight Smith were heavily recruited by Western Kentucky Hilltoppers coach Edgar Diddle and joined the team in 1963. They became the first African-American athletes to play for Western Kentucky. They won the Ohio Valley Conference two years in a row under the direction of the popular WKU head coach John Oldham, who succeeded Diddle their sophomore year. Haskins was the Ohio Valley Conference Player of the Year in 1966. In the 1966 NCAA Division I men's basketball tournament, the Hilltoppers were 2 points away from defeating Michigan and meeting the University of Kentucky Wildcats in the Mideast regional final. A controversial foul called against Smith during a jump ball put Cazzie Russell on the free throw line for Michigan, where he scored the tying and winning baskets. In 1967, Haskins had broken his wrist in a game against Murray State on February 6. His team still won the Ohio Valley Conference again. In the 1967 NCAA Division I men's basketball tournament, the #3-ranked Hilltoppers lost to eventual national runner-up Dayton in overtime in the Mideast quarterfinals.

== NBA career ==
After a successful college career, Haskins was selected by the Chicago Bulls in the first round of the 1967 NBA draft and by the Kentucky Colonels in the American Basketball Association draft. Haskins played nine years in the NBA with three teams (the Bulls, the Phoenix Suns, and the Washington Bullets). He retired in 1976 due to knee injuries, having tallied 8,743 career points.

== Coaching career ==
After his NBA career, Haskins returned to Western Kentucky University, first as an assistant coach in 1977 and then as head coach in 1980. As head coach, he led Western Kentucky to two NCAA appearances and one NIT appearance.

In 1986, Haskins was hired by the University of Minnesota to rebuild the school's men's basketball program. He led the Gophers to a school-record 31 wins and the Final Four in 1997, winning the Clair Bee Coach of the Year Award in the same year. He also led Minnesota to NIT titles in 1993 and 1998. He joined Lenny Wilkens' staff to coach the United States men's basketball team to the gold medal in the 1996 Summer Olympics.

Haskins was known for sitting on a four-legged bar stool at Minnesota home games. Williams Arena has a raised floor which was hard on his knees, and ordinarily the team sits off the floor.

=== Minnesota academic scandal ===
On the day before the 1999 NCAA tournament, the St. Paul Pioneer Press reported that Jan Gangelhoff, the manager of the school's academic counseling office, claimed to have written more than 400 pieces of coursework (including theme papers, homework assignments and take-home tests) for 18 Golden Gophers players from 1994 to 1998, including the Gophers' run to the Final Four. The Gophers suspended four then-current players, including two starters, for the school's first-round game against Gonzaga; the Gophers lost that game. At the time, it was not known whether Haskins was involved. The Pioneer Press was harshly criticized for the timing of the report. Minnesota forced Haskins to resign after the season for his part in the violations. The school subsequently withdrew from postseason consideration for the 1999–2000 season, docked itself 11 scholarships from 2000 to 2004, and imposed other sanctions on the basketball program.

Initially, the university bought out Haskins's contract for $1.5 million. However, it sought to recover funds after learning more about Haskins' activities and, in 2002, a state judge ordered Haskins to return $815,000 of the buyout money. The decision was based on an arbitrator's recommendation and the university's conclusion that Haskins had lied to NCAA investigators and committed fraud by accepting the buyout.

The university had learned during its internal investigation that Haskins had paid Gangelhoff $3,000 to write papers for the players. Haskins had initially denied making the payment during an interview in June 1999, but acknowledged it a month later. In October 2000, the NCAA placed the Golden Gophers program on four years' probation, and stripped the school of its wins in the 1994, 1995, and 1997 NCAA Tournaments, as well as its NIT wins in 1996 and 1998. The Gophers were docked an additional five scholarships over three seasons. A few days later, the Big Ten Conference stripped Minnesota of the 1997 conference title and forced it to vacate every regular season game it played from 1993–94 to 1998–99. Officially, Minnesota's record for those years is 0–0. If not for these vacated games, Haskins' 242 wins would rank second on the Golden Gophers' wins list.

The NCAA imposed a seven-year "show-cause" order on Haskins. This meant that he would have to accept sanctions from the NCAA if he ever returned to coaching before the 2007–08 season unless his new employer could convince the NCAA that he'd served his punishment. The penalty was made so severe because Haskins had not only lied about the $3,500 payment, but advised several of the players involved to lie to the NCAA. Since most schools will not even consider hiring a coach with an outstanding "show-cause" on his record, Haskins was effectively blackballed from collegiate basketball until 2007.

== After coaching ==
Haskins did not return to coaching when his show-cause expired. He retired to his 750-acre (3.0 km^{2}) ranch near Campbellsville, Kentucky, where he raises cattle. He has also worked as a color commentator for Western Kentucky basketball home games.

== Career playing statistics ==
Legend
GP	Games played	GS	Games started	MPG	Minutes per game
FG%	Field goal percentage	3P%	3-point field goal percentage	FT%	Free throw percentage
RPG	Rebounds per game	APG	Assists per game	SPG	Steals per game
BPG	Blocks per game	PPG	Points per game	**Bold**	Career high
*	Led the league

=== NBA ===
==== Regular season ====
Year	Team	GP	MPG	FG%	FT%	RPG	APG	STL	BLK	PPG
1967–68	Chicago	76	19.4	.420	.658	3.0	2.2			8.9
1968–69	Chicago	79	36.4	.421	.781	4.5	3.9			17.2
1969–70	Chicago	**82***	**39.2**	.450	.783	**4.6**	**7.6**			**20.3**
1970–71	Phoenix	**82**	33.7	.440	.784	4.0	4.7			17.8
1971–72	Phoenix	79	31.1	.483	**.853**	3.4	3.7			15.7
1972–73	Phoenix	77	20.5	.464	.833	2.2	2.6			10.5
1973–74	Phoenix	81	22.5	.460	.842	2.7	3.2	**1.0**	**.2**	11.1
1974–75	Washington	70	10.0	.397	.841	1.1	1.1	.3	.1	4.0
1975–76	Washington	55	13.4	**.550**	.831	1.0	1.3	.4	.1	6.4
Career		681	25.9	.449	.792	3.1	3.5	.6	.1	12.8

==== Playoffs ====
Year	Team	GP	MPG	FG%	FT%	RPG	APG	SPG	BPG	PPG
1968	Chicago	5	10.6	.393	.667	1.8	1.4			5.2
1970	Chicago	5	**30.8**	.471	**.895**	**3.2**	**5.0**			**16.2**
1975	Washington	**13**	5.8	**.536**	.625	.5	.3	**.2**	**.1**	2.7
1976	Washington	5	8.0	.476	.400	1.0	.4	.0	.0	4.4
Career		28	11.5	.469	.737	1.3	1.4	.1	.1	5.9

== Head coaching record ==
Record table
Season	Team	Overall	Conference	Standing	Postseason
Western Kentucky Hilltoppers (Ohio Valley Conference) (1980–1982)
1980–81	Western Kentucky	21–8	12–2	1st	NCAA Division I First Round
1981–82	Western Kentucky	19–10	13–3	T–1st	NIT First Round
Western Kentucky Hilltoppers (Sun Belt Conference) (1982–1986)
1982–83	Western Kentucky	12–16	4–10	7th	
1983–84	Western Kentucky	12–17	5–9	6th	
1984–85	Western Kentucky	14–14	5–9	7th	
1985–86	Western Kentucky	23–8	10–4	2nd	NCAA Division I Second Round
Western Kentucky:		101–73 (.580)	49–37 (.570)		
Minnesota Golden Gophers (Big Ten Conference) (1986–1999)
1986–87	Minnesota	9–19	2–16	9th	
1987–88	Minnesota	10–18	4–14	9th	
1988–89	Minnesota	19–12	9–9	5th	NCAA Division I Sweet 16
1989–90	Minnesota	23–9	11–7	4th	NCAA Division I Elite Eight
1990–91	Minnesota	12–16	5–13	9th	
1991–92	Minnesota	16–16	8–10	6th	NIT First Round
1992–93	Minnesota	23–9	11–7	4th	NIT Champion
1993–94	Minnesota	22–13^{[Note A]}	10–8	4th	NCAA Division I Second Round
1994–95	Minnesota	19–13^{[Note A]}	10–8	4th	NCAA Division I First Round
1995–96	Minnesota	20–13 ^{[Note A]}	10–8	4th	
1996–97	Minnesota	31–4^{[Note A]}	16–2	1st	NCAA Division I Final Four
1997–98	Minnesota	20–15^{[Note A]}	6–10	8th	NIT Champion
1998–99	Minnesota	17–12	10–8	6th	NCAA Division I First Round
Minnesota:		239–166, .590 (243–170, .588)	119–120 (.498)		
Total:		340–239, .587 (344–243, .586)			
National champion Postseason invitational champion Conference regular season champion Conference regular season and conference tournament champion Division regular season champion Division regular season and conference tournament champion Conference tournament champion

== Awards ==
- High School Scholastic All-American, 1963
- Ohio Valley Conference Player of the Year, 1966, 1967
- First team All-American, 1967
- Ohio Valley Conference Coach of the Year, 1982
- Associated Press Coach of the Year, 1997

== See also ==
- List of NCAA Division I Men's Final Four appearances by coach

== Notes ==
^A. Tournament appearances from 1994 to 1998 were vacated by the NCAA. Minnesota also gained 1 win each in the 1994–95 and 1995–96 seasons via forfeits by opponents. Following a Big Ten Conference order to vacate all regular season games from 1993–94 to 1998–99, Minnesota erased all individual and team records from those seasons.
