= Lake Kelly =

American basketball coach

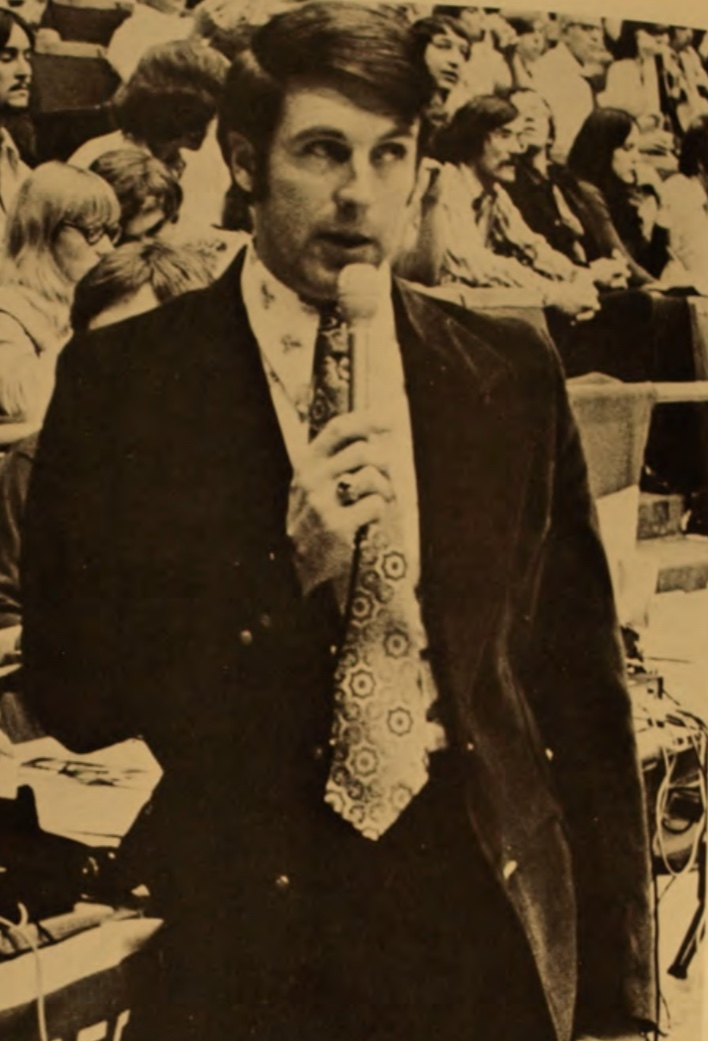
- Kelly at APSU during the 1972–73 season.

Biographical details
- Born: October 3, 1933; Flemingsburg, Kentucky, U.S.
- Died: March 5, 2009 (aged 75); Flemingsburg, Kentucky, U.S.

Playing career
- 1952–1956: Georgia Tech
- Position: Forward

Coaching career (HC unless noted)
- 1959–1960: Amelia HS
- 1960–1961: Morehead State (GA)
- 1962–1963: Morehead State (assistant)
- 1963–1964: Florida State (assistant)
- 1964–1965: Loyola (LA) (assistant)
- 1965–1968: Morehead State (assistant)
- 1969–1970: Lexington HS
- 1970–1971: Austin Peay (assistant)
- 1971–1977: Austin Peay
- 1977–1979: Oral Roberts
- 1979–1983: George Rogers Clark HS
- 1983–1985: Kentucky (assistant)
- 1985–1990: Austin Peay

Head coaching record
- Overall: 219–146 (.600)

Accomplishments and honors

Championships
- 3 OVC regular season (1973, 1974, 1977); OVC tournament (1987)

Awards
- OVC Coach of the Year (1973)

Lake Dudley Kelly (October 3, 1933 – March 5, 2009) was an American college basketball coach. He served as head coach of the Austin Peay Governors and Oral Roberts Golden Eagles.

Following his coaching career, Kelly became a school administrator in Fleming County, Kentucky.

== Head coaching record ==
Record table
Season	Team	Overall	Conference	Standing	Postseason
Austin Peay Governors (Ohio Valley Conference) (1971–1977)
1971–72	Austin Peay	10–14	5–9	T–6th	
1972–73	Austin Peay	22–7	11–3	1st	NCAA University Division Regional Semifinals
1973–74	Austin Peay	17–10	10–4	T–1st	NCAA Division I First Round
1974–75	Austin Peay	17–10	10–4	3rd	
1975–76	Austin Peay	20–7	10–4	2nd	
1976–77	Austin Peay	24–4	13–1	1st	
Oral Roberts Titans (Independent) (1977–1979)
1977–78	Oral Roberts	13–14			
1978–79	Oral Roberts	17–10			
Oral Roberts:		30–24 (.556)			
Austin Peay Governors (Ohio Valley Conference) (1985–1990)
1985–86	Austin Peay	14–14	8–6	T–3rd	
1986–87	Austin Peay	20–12	8–6	T–4th	NCAA Division I Second Round
1987–88	Austin Peay	17–13	10–4	T–3rd	
1988–89	Austin Peay	18–12	8–4	3rd	
1989–90	Austin Peay	10–19	2–10	7th	
Austin Peay:		189–122 (.608)	95–55 (.633)		
Total:		219–146 (.600)			
National champion Postseason invitational champion Conference regular season champion Conference regular season and conference tournament champion Division regular season champion Division regular season and conference tournament champion Conference tournament champion
