= 1981–82 Western Kentucky Hilltoppers basketball team =

American college basketball season

1981–82 Western Kentucky Hilltoppers basketball

Ohio Valley Conference Champion

NIT Tournament, First Round
- Conference: Ohio Valley Conference
- Record: 19–10 (13–3 OVC)
- Head coach: Clem Haskins
- Home arena: E. A. Diddle Arena

1981–82 Ohio Valley Conference men's basketball standings
	Conf.				Overall
Team	W		L	PCT	W		L	PCT
Western Kentucky	13	–	3	.813	19	–	10	.655
Murray State	13	–	3	.813	20	–	8	.714
Middle Tennessee State †	12	–	4	.750	22	–	8	.733
Morehead State	11	–	5	.688	17	–	10	.630
Tennessee Tech	8	–	8	.500	12	–	14	.462
Youngstown State	5	–	11	.313	8	–	18	.308
Austin Peay	4	–	12	.250	6	–	20	.231
Akron	3	–	13	.188	7	–	19	.269
Eastern Kentucky	3	–	13	.188	5	–	21	.192
† 1982 OVC tournament winner Rankings from AP poll

The 1981–82 Western Kentucky Hilltoppers men's basketball team represented Western Kentucky University during the 1981–82 NCAA Division I men's basketball season. The Hilltoppers were led by coach Clem Haskins and All-Ohio Valley Conference center Craig McCormick. In what would be their last year in the conference, WKU won the OVC championship, were OVC tournament runners-up, and received a bid to the 1982 National Invitation Tournament. Bobby Jones joined McCormick on the All-OVC Team; Jones and Kenny Ellis made the OVC Tournament Team and McCormick was tournament MVP. McCormick was selected in the NBA draft following the season.

== Schedule ==
Date time, TV	Rank^{#}	Opponent^{#}	Result	Record	Site city, state
Non-conference regular season
November 27, 1981*		vs. Nevada; Sun Met Classic	L 70–84	0–1	Selland Arena; Fresno, CA
November 28, 1981*		vs. Oklahoma City; Sun Met Classic	W 51–49	1–1	Selland Arena; Fresno, CA
December 4, 1981*		New Hampshire; Wendy’s Classic	W 83–52	2–1	E. A. Diddle Arena; Bowling Green, KY
December 5, 1981*		No. 3 Louisville; Wendy’s Classic	L 66–71	2–2	E. A. Diddle Arena; Bowling Green, KY
December 9, 1981*		Butler	W 96–65	3–2	E. A. Diddle Arena; Bowling Green, KY
December 12, 1981*		at Evansville	L 70–73	3–3	Roberts Municipal Stadium; Evansville, IN
Ohio Valley Conference regular season
December 19, 1981		Austin Peay	W 77–64	4–3 (1–0)	E. A. Diddle Arena; Bowling Green, KY
December 22, 1981*		at No. 17 Georgetown (D.C.)	L 45–64	4–4	Capital Centre; Landover, MD
December 30, 1981*		Duquesne	L 62–63 ^{OT}	4–5	E. A. Diddle Arena; Bowling Green, KY
January 3, 1982		Murray State	W 71–54	5–5 (2–0)	E. A. Diddle Arena; Bowling Green, KY
January 7, 1982		at Morehead State	L 57–59	5–6 (2–1)	Ellis Johnson Arena; Morehead, KY
January 10, 1982		at Eastern Kentucky	W 75–65	6–6 (3–1)	Alumni Coliseum; Richmond, KY
January 14, 1982		Middle Tennessee	W 65–49	7–6 (4–1)	E. A. Diddle Arena; Bowling Green, KY
January 16, 1982		Tennessee Tech	W 51–50	8–6 (5–1)	E. A. Diddle Arena; Bowling Green, KY
January 21, 1982		at Akron	W 77–68	9–6 (6–1)	James A. Rhodes Arena; Akron, OH
January 23, 1982		at Youngstown State	W 68–59	10–6 (7–1)	Beeghly Center; Youngstown, OH
January 25, 1982*		Dayton	W 65–57	11–6	E. A. Diddle Arena; Bowling Green, KY
January 28, 1982		at Austin Peay	W 48–46	12–6 (8–1)	Dunn Center; Clarksville, TN
January 30, 1982		at Murray State	L 60–63	12–7 (8–2)	Racer Arena; Murray, KY
February 4, 1982		Eastern Kentucky	W 61–34	13–7 (9–2)	E. A. Diddle Arena; Bowling Green, KY
February 6, 1982		Morehead State	W 68–53	14–7 (10–2)	E. A. Diddle Arena; Bowling Green, KY
February 11, 1982		at Tennessee Tech	L 64–70 ^{OT}	14–8 (10–3)	Eblen Center; Cookeville, TN
February 13, 1982		at Middle Tennessee	W 75–64	15–8 (11–3)	Murphy Center; Murfreesboro, TN
February 18, 1982		Youngstown State	W 63–51	16–8 (12–3)	E. A. Diddle Arena; Bowling Green, KY
February 20, 1982		Akron	W 82–68	17–8 (13–3)	E. A. Diddle Arena; Bowling Green, KY
February 27, 1982*		Northern Iowa	W 75–67	18–8	UNI-Dome; Cedar Falls, IA
Ohio Valley Conference Tournament
March 5, 1982	(1)	(4) Morehead State; Semifinals	W 95–87	19–8	E. A. Diddle Arena; Bowling Green, KY
March 6, 1982	(1)	(3) Middle Tennessee; Championship	L 52–54	19–9	E. A. Diddle Arena; Bowling Green, KY
NIT
March 10, 1982*		at Purdue; First Round	L 65–72	19–10	Mackey Arena; West Lafayette, IN
*Non-conference game. ^{#}Rankings from AP Poll. (#) Tournament seedings in parentheses.
