= Mark Gottfried =

American basketball coach (born 1964)

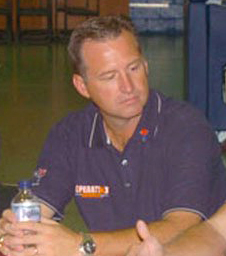
- Gottfried at Camp Arifjan in 2005

Biographical details
- Born: January 20, 1964 (age 62); Crestline, Ohio, U.S.

Playing career
- 1983–1984: Oral Roberts
- 1984–1987: Alabama

Coaching career (HC unless noted)
- 1987–1995: UCLA (assistant)
- 1995–1998: Murray State
- 1998–2009: Alabama
- 2011–2017: NC State
- 2018–2021: Cal State Northridge

Head coaching record
- Overall: 438–292 (.600)
- Tournaments: 10–11 (NCAA Division I); 4–4 (NIT); 0–1 (CBI)

Accomplishments and honors

Championships
- 3 OVC Regular Season (1996–1998); 2 OVC Tournament (1997, 1998); SEC Regular Season (2002)

Awards
- OVC Coach of the Year (1998); SEC Coach of the Year (2002)

Mark Frederick Gottfried (born January 20, 1964) is an American former men's college basketball coach, basketball podcaster, and former player who most recently served as head coach of the Cal State Northridge Matadors.

Gottfried played one season at Oral Roberts and three seasons at Alabama, advancing to the Sweet Sixteen in each of his seasons with the Crimson Tide. He spent eight seasons as an assistant coach at UCLA, including the team's 1995 NCAA championship season, three years as head coach at Murray State, eleven years as head coach at Alabama, and six seasons at North Carolina State.

== Early years ==
Gottfried was born in Crestline, Ohio. He played varsity basketball at Carterville High School in Carterville, Illinois, and Carbondale Community High School in Carbondale, Illinois. He then played for UMS Prep (now known as UMS-Wright Preparatory School) in Mobile, Alabama, during his senior year, averaging 21.6 ppg/11.2 rpg before graduating in 1982. As a student, he was selected to the National Honor Society. Gottfried was inducted into UMS-Wright's Hall of Fame and in 2004, was the UMS Alumnus of the Year.

== College career ==
Gottfried attended Oral Roberts on a basketball scholarship. After playing there for one season, where he was a Freshman All-American, he transferred to Alabama. There, he started 98 consecutive games, and Alabama advanced to the Sweet Sixteen in all three seasons he played. He holds the school records for most 3-point shots made in a single game with eight in a 1987 game against Vanderbilt, and for career 3-point field goal percentage (.485, 81–167). Gottfried graduated with a Bachelor of Arts & Sciences in Communications from the University of Alabama in 1987, after winning both the school's Hayden Riley Top Scholar Award and the Bryant Award as the school's top scholar-athlete during his senior year. He was selected by the Detroit Pistons in the seventh round of the 1987 NBA draft, though he never played professionally. Instead, he spent three years touring with Athletes in Action, then attended UCLA graduate school for two years.

== Coaching career ==
=== UCLA ===
Gottfried served as an assistant coach for eight seasons (1988–95) at UCLA under Jim Harrick. Other members of the staff were former St. John's and UCLA head coach Steve Lavin and former Washington head coach Lorenzo Romar. The Bruins were the 1995 NCAA champions with Gottfried as an assistant coach and recruiter. The Bruins were ranked 1st nationally for their recruiting class in 1994 and produced future NBA players Ed O'Bannon, George Zidek, Tyus Edney, Don MacLean, Tracy Murray, Trevor Wilson, Darrick Martin and Mitchell Butler. Gottfried faced his former school twice as head coach at Alabama, losing 79–57 in the 2001 John Wooden Classic and losing 62–59 in the second round of the 2006 NCAA tournament.

=== Murray State ===
Gottfried was head coach from 1995 to 1998 at Murray State University and compiled a 68–24 overall record. Murray State advanced to the NCAA tournament in 1997 and again in 1998 and made the NIT in his first season there in 1996. He coached the Racers to Ohio Valley Conference championships in each of his seasons as head coach, becoming the first head coach to win three OVC titles in only three seasons. In his last season, the Racers finished 25th in the final AP Poll.

=== Alabama ===
Gottfried was hired by the University of Alabama on March 25, 1998. He led the Tide to the SEC regular season championship in the 2001–02 season, their first regular-season title in 15 years. The following year, his team became the first in Crimson Tide history to be ranked No. 1 in the AP poll. The team held the ranking for two weeks before losing 51–49 to Utah shortly before conference play. During the end of the following season, his team upset top-ranked and top-seeded Stanford in the second round of the NCAA tournament. The squad then defeated reigning national champion Syracuse to advance to the Elite Eight, achieving another program first. The Tide ultimately lost to eventual national champion UConn. For his efforts, Gottfried was named SEC coach of the year by the AP and his fellow coaches. The next season, Alabama entered the NCAA tournament as a fifth seed before suffering a first-round loss to UW–Milwaukee.

Although it was not apparent at the time, Gottfried's tenure cratered after the 2004-05 season. Subsequent years were marked by key player injuries and disappointment. Alabama posted back-to-back losing seasons in the SEC in 2006–07 and 2007–08. The 2007–08 season marked the first time in nine years (only the second time under Gottfried) that Alabama did not reach either the NIT or NCAA post-season tournament, although the Tide did receive an invitation to the first annual College Basketball Invitational, which it did not accept. On January 26, 2009, after the controversial departure of player Ronald Steele and an underperforming season at that point, Gottfried met with Alabama Athletics Director Mal Moore and resigned mid-season.

=== NC State ===
On April 5, 2011, Gottfried accepted the job as head coach of the NC State Wolfpack men's basketball team. To celebrate the upcoming basketball season, Gottfried planned to perform a tandem skydive into Carter Finley Stadium during halftime of a football game. The jump, scheduled for September 17, 2011, was canceled due to weather concerns.

On March 11, 2012, the NC State Wolfpack men's basketball team received an 11th seed in the NCAA tournament. Because his team was selected into the tournament, Gottfried received a two-year extension on his contract through April 4, 2018. On March 18, 2012, Gottfried's 11th-seeded Wolfpack team defeated the 3rd-seeded Georgetown Hoyas in the 3rd round of the NCAA Tournament, earning a Sweet 16 berth. Five days later, the Wolfpack lost to 2nd-seeded Kansas Jayhawks in the Sweet 16.

On January 12, 2013, Gottfried became just the 14th coach in history to beat the #1 ranked team in the country with two separate schools after beating Duke 84–76 (having previously done so at Alabama).

During the 2014–2015 season, NC State picked up wins against two Top 10 conference opponents (Jan 11 vs Duke and Feb 14 vs Louisville). Both Top 10 victories came immediately after losses to the ACC leading Virginia Cavaliers. The road victory against the Louisville Cardinals was only the third time since the turn of the century that the Wolfpack had picked up a road win vs. an AP Top 10 squad, snapping a 22-game drought in such games. NC State would qualify for the NCAA Tournament as an 8 seed eliminating the top seeded Villanova Wildcats before falling to number 4 seed Louisville Cardinals in the Sweet 16 Gottfried's second in 4 years with the Wolfpack. However it would be Gottfried's last winning season in Raleigh.

On January 23, 2017, Gottfried earned his 400th career win as a head coach by defeating #17 Duke in an 84–82 thriller at Cameron Indoor Stadium. It was the first time since January 1995 that NC State had won at Duke.

After two losing consecutive seasons, including going 9–27 in the ACC during those seasons and several transfers out, Gottfried was on the hot seat.

On February 16, 2017, after a meeting between Gottfried and athletic director Debbie Yow, NC State announced that Gottfried would not return as head coach for the following season.

In July 2019, the NCAA charged NC State with a series of violations regarding the recruitment of former star Dennis Smith Jr. They included two Level I violations against Gottfried, including failure to control the program and failure to monitor assistant Orlando Early, who was accused of facilitating payments to Smith. In December 2021, the NCAA placed NC State on one year of probation for the violations and ordered the Wolfpack to vacate all of its wins in 2016–17. It also slapped Gottfried with a one-year show-cause penalty, effective until December 19, 2022. If Gottfried works at another NCAA member school during this period, that school must show why Gottfried must not be sanctioned. Early was hit with a six-year show-cause penalty.

=== Dallas Mavericks ===
Gottfried joined the Dallas Mavericks as an assistant coach for their 2017 NBA Summer League team. The Mavericks had drafted Dennis Smith Jr., who played for Gottfried at NC State for one season, in the 2017 NBA draft.

=== Cal State Northridge ===
Gottfried was hired as head coach of Cal State Northridge on March 12, 2018. The infractions case at NC State was announced shortly after the end of Gottfried's first season, leading Yahoo! Sports' Pat Forde to recall that CSU Northridge's decision to hire him had been much criticized. In April 2021, CSU Northridge placed Gottfried and his staff on leave amid an internal investigation into potential rules violations in the basketball program. He never returned; he and CSU Northridge mutually agreed to part ways in December 2021, shortly after he was handed a show-cause penalty for the violations at NC State. Had Gottfried returned, CSU Northridge would have had to convince the NCAA that Gottfried should not be sanctioned, and could have been severely punished had he committed additional violations while his show-cause order was in effect. Trent Johnson was named interim coach for the 2021–22 season, and won the job on a permanent basis after the season.

== Family ==
Gottfried is divorced and the father of four sons and one daughter. His oldest son, Brandon, was a standout athlete at Gulf Shores High School (Gulf Shores, Alabama) in both football and basketball and graduated from Stanford University, where he played football as a tight end. His daughter, Mary Layson, is an accomplished international fashion model. His father, Joe Gottfried, is a former NCAA Southern Illinois Univ-Carbondale basketball coach and retired as director of athletics at the University of South Alabama in 2009. His uncle, Mike Gottfried, was a college football head coach (Murray State, Cincinnati, Kansas and Pittsburgh) and an analyst on ESPN college football broadcasts.

== Head coaching record ==
Record table
Season	Team	Overall	Conference	Standing	Postseason
Murray State Racers (Ohio Valley Conference) (1995–1997)
1995–96	Murray State	19–10	12–4	1st	NIT First Round
1996–97	Murray State	20–10	12–6	T–1st	NCAA Division I Round of 64
1997–98	Murray State	29–4	16–2	1st	NCAA Division I Round of 64
Murray State:		68–24 (.739)	40–12 (.769)		
Alabama Crimson Tide (Southeastern Conference) (1998–2009)
1998–99	Alabama	17–15	6–10	T–5th (West)	NIT First Round
1999–00	Alabama	13–16	6–10	4th (West)	
2000–01	Alabama	25–11	8–8	3rd (West)	NIT Runner-Up
2001–02	Alabama	27–8	12–4	1st (West)	NCAA Division I Round of 32
2002–03	Alabama	17–12	7–9	4th (West)	NCAA Division I Round of 64
2003–04	Alabama	20–13	8–8	T–2nd (West)	NCAA Division I Elite Eight
2004–05	Alabama	24–8	12–4	T–1st (West)	NCAA Division I Round of 64
2005–06	Alabama	18–13	10–6	2nd (West)	NCAA Division I Round of 32
2006–07	Alabama	20–12	7–9	T–3rd (West)	NIT First Round
2007–08	Alabama	17–16	5–11	5th (West)	
2008–09	Alabama	12–7 ^{†}	2–3 ^{†}		^{†}Resigned mid-season
Alabama:		210–131 (.616)	83–82 (.503)		
NC State Wolfpack (Atlantic Coast Conference) (2011–2017)
2011–12	NC State	24–13	9–7	T–4th	NCAA Division I Sweet 16
2012–13	NC State	24–11	11–7	T–4th	NCAA Division I Round of 64
2013–14	NC State	22–14	9–9	7th	NCAA Division I Round of 64
2014–15	NC State	22–14	10–8	T–6th	NCAA Division I Sweet 16
2015–16	NC State	16–17	5–13	13th	
2016–17	NC State	15–17	4–14	T–13th	
NC State:		123–86 (.589)	48–58 (.453)		
Cal State Northridge Matadors (Big West Conference) (2018–2021)
2018–19	Cal State Northridge	13–21	7–9	T–6th	CBI First Round
2019–20	Cal State Northridge	15–17	10–6	T–2nd	
2020–21	Cal State Northridge	9–13	5–9	8th	
Cal State Northridge:		37–51 (.420)	22–24 (.478)		
Total:		438–292 (.600)			
National champion Postseason invitational champion Conference regular season champion Conference regular season and conference tournament champion Division regular season champion Division regular season and conference tournament champion Conference tournament champion
