= 1997 Ohio Valley Conference men's basketball tournament =

- Classification: Division I
- Season: 1996–97
- Teams: 8
- Site: Nashville Arena; Nashville, Tennessee
- Champions: Murray State (8th title)
- Winning coach: Mark Gottfried (1st title)

1996–97 Ohio Valley Conference men's basketball standings
	Conf.				Overall
Team	W		L	PCT	W		L	PCT
Austin Peay	12	–	6	.667	17	–	14	.548
Murray State †	12	–	6	.667	20	–	10	.667
Middle Tennessee	11	–	7	.611	19	–	12	.613
Tennessee Tech	10	–	8	.556	15	–	13	.536
Eastern Illinois	9	–	9	.500	12	–	15	.444
Southeast Missouri State	9	–	9	.500	12	–	18	.400
UT Martin	8	–	10	.444	11	–	16	.407
Tennessee State	7	–	11	.389	9	–	18	.333
Morehead State	6	–	12	.333	8	–	19	.296
Eastern Kentucky	6	–	12	.333	8	–	18	.308
† 1997 OVC tournament winner Rankings from AP Poll

The 1997 Ohio Valley Conference men's basketball tournament was the final event of the 1996–97 season in the Ohio Valley Conference. The tournament was held February 25–March 1, 1997, at Nashville Arena in Nashville, Tennessee.

Murray State defeated Austin Peay in the championship game, 88–85 in OT, to win their eighth overall OVC men's basketball tournament.

The Racers received an automatic bid to the 1997 NCAA tournament as the No. 15 seed in the Southeast region.

== Format ==
Eight of the ten conference members participated in the tournament field. They were seeded based on regular season conference records, with play beginning in the quarterfinal round. Eastern Kentucky and UT Martin did not participate.

== Bracket ==
Quarterfinals; Tuesday, March 6
1	Austin Peay	106
8	Morehead State	83
4	Tennessee Tech	83
5	Eastern Illinois	81
3	Middle Tennessee	89
6	Southeast Missouri State	74
2	Murray State	76
7	Tennessee State	63

Semifinals; Wednesday, March 7
1	Austin Peay	70
4	Tennessee Tech	60
3	Middle Tennessee	48
2	Murray State	74

Championship; Thursday, March 8
1	Austin Peay	85^{OT}
2	Murray State	88
