= 1998 Ohio Valley Conference men's basketball tournament =

- Classification: Division I
- Season: 1997–98
- Teams: 8
- First round site: Campus Sites
- Semifinals site: Gaylord Entertainment Center; Nashville, Tennessee
- Finals site: Gaylord Entertainment Center; Nashville, Tennessee
- Champions: Murray State (9th title)
- Winning coach: Mark Gottfried (2nd title)
- MVP: Chad Townsend (Murray State)

1997–98 Ohio Valley Conference men's basketball standings
	Conf.				Overall
Team	W		L	PCT	W		L	PCT
No. 25 Murray State †	16	–	2	.889	29	–	4	.879
Eastern Illinois	13	–	5	.722	16	–	11	.593
Middle Tennessee	12	–	6	.667	19	–	9	.679
Austin Peay	11	–	7	.611	17	–	11	.607
Southeast Missouri State	10	–	8	.556	14	–	13	.519
Tennessee State	8	–	10	.444	13	–	16	.448
Eastern Kentucky	8	–	10	.444	10	–	17	.370
Tennessee Tech	5	–	13	.278	9	–	21	.300
UT Martin	5	–	13	.278	7	–	20	.259
Morehead State	2	–	16	.111	3	–	23	.115
† 1998 OVC tournament winner Rankings from AP Poll

The 1998 Ohio Valley Conference men's basketball tournament was the postseason men's basketball tournament of the Ohio Valley Conference during the 1997–98 NCAA Division I men's basketball season. It was held February 24–March 1, 1998. The first round was hosted by the higher seeded team in each game. The semifinals and finals took place at Gaylord Entertainment Center in Nashville, Tennessee.

Top-seeded Murray State won the tournament, defeating Tennessee State in the championship game, and received the Ohio Valley's automatic bid to the NCAA tournament. For the second consecutive year, Chad Townsend of Murray State was named the tournament's most valuable player.

== Format ==
The top eight eligible men's basketball teams in the Ohio Valley Conference receive a berth in the conference tournament. After the regular season, teams were seeded by conference record.

== Bracket ==
Quarterfinals; February 24
1	Murray State	84
8	Tennessee Tech	63
4	Austin Peay	76
5	Southeast Missouri State	46
3	Middle Tennessee	61
6	Eastern Kentucky	49
2	Eastern Illinois	79
7	Tennessee State	84

Semifinals; February 28
1	Murray State	81
4	Austin Peay	56
3	Middle Tennessee	70
7	Tennessee State	74

Finals; March 1
1	Murray State	92
7	Tennessee State	69
