= Dwight Smith (basketball) =

American basketball player (1945–1967)

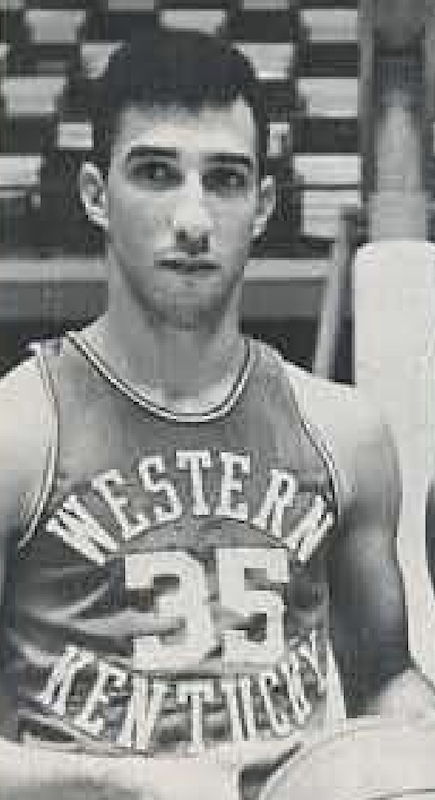
- Smith with the Western Kentucky Hilltoppers, c. 1966

Personal information
- Born: August 27, 1945 Princeton, Kentucky, U.S.
- Died: May 14, 1967 (aged 21) near Nortonville, Kentucky, U.S.
- Listed height: 6 ft 5 in (1.96 m)
- Listed weight: 200 lb (91 kg)

Career information
- High school: Dotson (Princeton, Kentucky)
- College: Western Kentucky (1964–1967)
- NBA draft: 1967: 3rd round, 23rd overall pick
- Drafted by: Los Angeles Lakers
- Position: Guard

Career highlights
- 3× All-OVC (1965–1967); No. 35 jersey retired by Western Kentucky Hilltoppers
- Stats at Basketball Reference

Dwight E. Smith (August 27, 1945 – May 14, 1967) was an American basketball player. He played college basketball for the Western Kentucky Hilltoppers from 1964 to 1967. Smith was selected by the Los Angeles Lakers in the third round of the 1967 NBA draft but was killed in a car accident less than two weeks later.

== Early life ==
Smith was born on August 27, 1945, in Princeton, Kentucky, to Henry Vernal and Pearl Smith. His father worked as a basketball referee and one of his uncles, George "Sonny" Smith, played for the Harlem Globetrotters.

Smith attended the all-black Dotson High School in Princeton. He led the team to the state tournament and was selected to the all-state team in 1963. His father claimed that Smith received "letters from everywhere" during his college recruitment even though "a lot of schools at that time wouldn't take blacks."

== College career ==
Smith played college basketball for the Western Kentucky Hilltoppers from 1964 to 1967. He and Clem Haskins were the first African-American basketball players to play for the Hilltoppers and were among the first black college basketball players in the Southern United States. Smith was later joined by his younger brother, Greg, and formed one of the best-known brother combinations in college basketball.

Smith was named to the All-Ohio Valley Conference (OVC) team all three years of his varsity career. Standing at 6 ft 5 in (1.96 m), Smith was one of the tallest guards in college basketball at the time. He led the nation in rebounds by a guard during his sophomore and senior seasons. Hilltoppers coach John Oldham called Smith the greatest rebounding guard in the nation. Smith also served as the Hilltoppers' playmaker throughout his collegiate career. Haskins claimed that Smith sacrificed himself during their time on the Hilltoppers by focusing on being a great defensive player and point guard instead of scoring. He was team captain during his junior and senior seasons. Smith averaged 14.6 points and 10.9 rebounds per game in his three seasons with the Hilltoppers. He left the Hilltoppers ranked ninth among the program's all-time scoring leaders.

Smith majored in physical education and sociology. He aspired to become a coach. On March 10, 1967, Smith was commissioned as a Kentucky Colonel by governor Ned Breathitt.

== Professional career ==
On May 3, 1967, Smith was selected by the Los Angeles Lakers in the third round of the 1967 NBA draft. It was Smith's childhood dream to play for the Lakers alongside Elgin Baylor and Jerry West. He was also selected in the 1967 ABA draft by the Kentucky Colonels. Smith planned to visit Los Angeles in the following weeks. Oldham called Smith "a tremendous player" who "had a great future in pro ranks."

== Death ==
On May 14, 1967, Smith was killed in a car accident aged 21. He and his sister Kay were being driven by their brother Greg as they returned to Western Kentucky after a visit to their home in Princeton for Mother's Day. Their car was one mile south of Nortonville, Kentucky, when it hit high water and plunged into a rain-swollen ditch. A witness of the accident used their ambulance to pull the car out but Smith and Kay were already dead. Greg survived and was taken to a nearby hospital where he received treatment.

On May 19, 2,500 people attended the funeral of Smith and Kay held in the gymnasium of Caldwell County High School. The service was attended by Oldham, Wes Unseld, Butch Beard, Jim McDaniels, and all of Smith's Hilltoppers teammates. Smith and Kay were buried next to each other in Cedar Hill Cemetery.

== Legacy ==
Smith had not taken his final exams at the time of his death but Western Kentucky University still awarded his degree. He became the first college graduate in his family. Western Kentucky's College Heights Foundation established an annual scholarship from the Dwight and Kay Smith Scholarship Fund for a student from Caldwell County, Kentucky.

Smith was inducted into the Western Kentucky Athletics Hall of Fame in 1996. He was inducted into the Kentucky High School Basketball Hall of Fame in 2016.

On February 4, 2023, the Hilltoppers retired Smith's number 35 jersey in a ceremony that was attended by Greg and his two other siblings. He was the 11th player in program history to have their jersey retired.

== See also ==
- List of basketball players who died during their careers
