= 1980–81 Western Kentucky Hilltoppers basketball team =

American college basketball season

1980–81 Western Kentucky Hilltoppers basketball

OVC Tournament Champion Ohio Valley Conference Champion

NCAA Tournament, First Round
- Conference: Ohio Valley Conference
- Record: 21–8 (12–2 OVC)
- Head coach: Clem Haskins
- Home arena: E. A. Diddle Arena

1980–81 Ohio Valley Conference men's basketball standings
	Conf.				Overall
Team	W		L	PCT	W		L	PCT
Western Kentucky †	12	–	2	.857	21	–	8	.724
Murray State	10	–	4	.714	17	–	10	.630
Middle Tennessee	9	–	5	.643	18	–	9	.667
Austin Peay	7	–	7	.500	14	–	13	.519
Eastern Kentucky	7	–	7	.500	10	–	16	.385
Akron	5	–	9	.357	8	–	18	.308
Morehead State	4	–	10	.286	11	–	15	.423
Tennessee Tech	2	–	12	.143	6	–	20	.231
† 1981 OVC tournament winner Rankings from AP poll

The 1980–81 Western Kentucky Hilltoppers men's basketball team represented Western Kentucky University during the 1980–81 NCAA Division I men's basketball season. The Hilltoppers were members of the Ohio Valley Conference and led by OVC Coach of the Year Clem Haskins, in his first season as head coach. WKU won the OVC regular season and tournament championships and received the conference's automatic bid to the 1981 NCAA Division I Basketball Tournament. Craig McCormick and Tony Wilson made the All-OVC Team, and Wilson and Percy White were selected to the OVC Tournament Team.

== Cultural relevance ==
Haskins broke the color barrier this season at Western Kentucky, becoming the first African American head coach in school history. This came 16 years after he, and Dwight Smith, became the first African Americans to play Hilltopper basketball.

== Schedule ==
Date time, TV	Rank^{#}	Opponent^{#}	Result	Record	Site city, state
Regular season
11/28/1980*		South Carolina; Wendy’s Classic	W 73–69	1–0	E. A. Diddle Arena; Bowling Green, KY
11/29/1980*		Vanderbilt; Wendy’s Classic	L 76–78	1–1	E. A. Diddle Arena; Bowling Green, KY
12/1/1980*		Alabama–Huntsville	W 83–73	2–1	E. A. Diddle Arena; Bowling Green, KY
12/4/1980*		at Texas Tech	L 58–68	2–2	Lubbock Municipal Coliseum; Lubbock, TX
12/6/1980*		at Rice	W 76–63	3–2	Tudor Fieldhouse; Houston, TX
12/9/1980*		at Dayton	L 70–74	3–3	UD Arena; Dayton, OH
12/13/1980*		Evansville	L 70–73	4–3	E. A. Diddle Arena; Bowling Green, KY
12/29/1980*		vs. Saint Louis; Connecticut Mutual Classic	W 57–54	5–3	Hartford Civic Center; Hartford, CT
12/30/1980		at Connecticut; Connecticut Mutual Classic	L 58–84	5–4	Hartford Civic Center; Hartford, CT
1/3/1981*		District of Columbia	W 86–84 ^{3OT}	6–4	E. A. Diddle Arena; Bowling Green, KY
1/5/1981		at Akron	W 68–62	7–4 (1-0)	James A. Rhodes Arena; Akron, OH
1/10/1981		at Tennessee Tech	W 65–51	8–4 (2-0)	Eblen Center; Cookeville, TN
1/15/1981		at Murray State	L 57–59 ^{OT}	8–5 (2-1)	Racer Arena; Murray, KY
1/17/1981		Austin Peay	W 70–58	9–5 (3-1)	E. A. Diddle Arena; Bowling Green, KY
1/22/1981		Middle Tennessee	W 67–55	10–5 (4-1)	E. A. Diddle Arena; Bowling Green, KY
1/24/1981		Morehead State	W 75–68	11–5 (5-1)	E. A. Diddle Arena; Bowling Green, KY
1/29/1981		at Eastern Kentucky	W 84–80	12–5 (6-1)	Alumni Coliseum; Richmond, KY
1/31/1981		at Morehead State	W 77–65	13–5 (7-1)	Ellis Johnson Arena; Morehead, KY
2/5/1981		Akron	W 83–61	14–5 (8-1)	E. A. Diddle Arena; Bowling Green, KY
2/7/1981		Tennessee Tech	W 72–59	15–5 (9-1)	E. A. Diddle Arena; Bowling Green, KY
2/12/1981		at Austin Peay	W 62–59	16–5 (10-1)	Dunn Center; Clarksville, TN
2/14/1981		Murray State	W 66–44	17–5 (11-1)	E. A. Diddle Arena; Bowling Green, KY
2/19/1981		at Middle Tennessee	L 54–62	17–6 (11-2)	Murphy Center; Murfreesboro, TN
2/21/1981		Eastern Kentucky	W 78–62	18–6 (12-2)	E. A. Diddle Arena; Bowling Green, KY
2/27/1982*		Northern Iowa	W 69–64	19–6	E. A. Diddle Arena; Bowling Green, KY
2/28/1981*		at No. 20 Louisville	L 75–90	19–7	Freedom Hall; Louisville, KY
1981 Ohio Valley Conference Men's Basketball Tournament
3/6/1981	(1)	(4) Austin Peay; Semifinals	W 82–71	20–7	E. A. Diddle Arena; Bowling Green, KY
3/7/1981	(1)	(2) Murray State; Championship	W 71–67	21–7	E. A. Diddle Arena; Bowling Green, KY
1981 NCAA Division I Basketball Tournament
3/13/1981*	(10 ME)	vs. (7 ME) UAB; First Round	L 68–93	21–8	Memorial Coliseum; Tuscaloosa, AL
*Non-conference game. ^{#}Rankings from AP Poll. (#) Tournament seedings in parentheses.
