= 1989 Ohio Valley Conference men's basketball tournament =

- Classification: Division I
- Season: 1988–89
- Teams: 7
- First round site: Campus Sites; Campus Arenas
- Finals site: Nashville Municipal Auditorium; Nashville, Tennessee
- Champions: Middle Tennessee (5th title)
- Winning coach: Bruce Stewart
- MVP: Keith Rawls (Austin Peay)

1988–89 Ohio Valley Conference men's basketball standings
	Conf.				Overall
Team	W		L	PCT	W		L	PCT
Middle Tennessee †	10	–	2	.833	23	–	8	.742
Murray State	10	–	2	.833	19	–	11	.633
Austin Peay	8	–	4	.667	18	–	12	.600
Morehead State	5	–	7	.417	15	–	16	.484
Eastern Kentucky	4	–	8	.333	7	–	22	.241
Tennessee Tech	3	–	9	.250	10	–	20	.333
Tennessee State	2	–	10	.167	4	–	24	.143
† 1989 OVC tournament winner Rankings from AP Poll

The 1989 Ohio Valley Conference men's basketball tournament was the final event of the 1988–89 season in the Ohio Valley Conference. The tournament was held March 7–9, 1989, on campus sites and at the Nashville Municipal Auditorium in Nashville, Tennessee.

Middle Tennessee defeated Austin Peay in the championship game, 82–79, to win their fifth OVC men's basketball tournament.

The Blue Raiders received an automatic bid to the 1989 NCAA tournament as the #13 seed in the Southeast region.

== Bracket ==
Quarterfinals; Tuesday, March 7
4	Morehead State	50
5	Eastern Kentucky	63
3	Austin Peay	85
6	Tennessee Tech	84
2	Murray State	90
7	Tennessee State	71

Semifinals; Wednesday, March 8
1	Middle Tennessee	81
5	Eastern Kentucky	64
3	Austin Peay	74
2	Murray State	65

Championship; Thursday, March 9
1	Middle Tennessee	82
3	Austin Peay	79
