= 1996–97 Murray State Racers men's basketball team =

American college basketball season

1996–97 Murray State Racers men's basketball

Ohio Valley Regular season champions Ohio Valley tournament champions

NCAA tournament, first round
- Conference: Ohio Valley Conference
- Record: 20–10 (12–6 OVC)
- Head coach: Mark Gottfried (2nd season)
- Home arena: Racer Arena

1996–97 Ohio Valley Conference men's basketball standings
	Conf.				Overall
Team	W		L	PCT	W		L	PCT
Austin Peay	12	–	6	.667	17	–	14	.548
Murray State †	12	–	6	.667	20	–	10	.667
Middle Tennessee	11	–	7	.611	19	–	12	.613
Tennessee Tech	10	–	8	.556	15	–	13	.536
Eastern Illinois	9	–	9	.500	12	–	15	.444
Southeast Missouri State	9	–	9	.500	12	–	18	.400
UT Martin	8	–	10	.444	11	–	16	.407
Tennessee State	7	–	11	.389	9	–	18	.333
Morehead State	6	–	12	.333	8	–	19	.296
Eastern Kentucky	6	–	12	.333	8	–	18	.308
† 1997 OVC tournament winner Rankings from AP Poll

The 1996–97 Murray State Racers men's basketball team represented Murray State University during the 1996–97 NCAA Division I men's basketball season. The Racers, led by second-year head coach Mark Gottfried, played their home games at Racer Arena in Murray, Kentucky as members of the Ohio Valley Conference. They finished the season 20–10, 12–6 in OVC play to finish second in the OVC regular season standings. They defeated Austin Peay to win the OVC tournament to advance to the NCAA tournament. As No. 15 seed in the Southeast region, the Racers were beaten by No. 2 seed Duke, 71–68.

== Roster ==
1996–97 Murray State Racers men's basketball team
Players
Coaches

Pos.	#	Name	Height	Weight	Year	Hometown
G	10	Chad Townsend	—	—	Jr
F	22	Vincent Rainey	6 ft 5 in (1.96 m)	—	Sr
G	51	De'Teri Mayes	6 ft 3 in (1.91 m)	—	Jr	Montgomery, Alabama

Head coach

- Mark Gottfried (Alabama)

Assistant coach(es)

Legend

- (C) Team captain
- (S) Suspended
- (I) Ineligible
- (W) Walk-on
- Injured
- Current redshirt

== Schedule and results ==
Date time, TV	Rank^{#}	Opponent^{#}	Result	Record	Site (attendance) city, state
Regular season
Nov 23, 1996*		Belmont	W 84–45	1–0	Racer Arena; Murray, Kentucky
Nov 25, 1996*		IUPUI	W 85–75	2–0	Racer Arena; Murray, Kentucky
Dec 2, 1996*		at Middle Tennessee	L 72–85	2–1	Murphy Athletic Center; Murfreesboro, Tennessee
Dec 5, 1996*		Alcorn State	W 107–86	3–1	Racer Arena; Murray, Kentucky
Ohio Valley Conference tournament
Feb 28, 1997*		vs. Middle Tennessee; Semifinals	W 74–48	19–9	Bridgestone Arena; Nashville, Tennessee
Mar 1, 1997*		vs. Austin Peay; Championship game	W 88–85 ^{OT}	20–9	Bridgestone Arena; Nashville, Tennessee
NCAA tournament
Mar 14, 1997*	(15 SE)	vs. (2 SE) No. 8 Duke; First round	L 68–71	20–10	Charlotte Coliseum; Charlotte, North Carolina
*Non-conference game. ^{#}Rankings from AP Poll. (#) Tournament seedings in parentheses. SE=Southeast. All times are in Central Time.
