= 1981 Ohio Valley Conference men's basketball tournament =

Men's Basketball Tournament

- Classification: Division I
- Season: 1980–81
- Teams: 4
- Site: E. A. Diddle Arena; Bowling Green, Kentucky
- Champions: Western Kentucky Hilltoppers (10th title)
- Winning coach: Clem Haskins (1st title)

1980–81 Ohio Valley Conference men's basketball standings
	Conf.				Overall
Team	W		L	PCT	W		L	PCT
Western Kentucky †	12	–	2	.857	21	–	8	.724
Murray State	10	–	4	.714	17	–	10	.630
Middle Tennessee	9	–	5	.643	18	–	9	.667
Austin Peay	7	–	7	.500	14	–	13	.519
Eastern Kentucky	7	–	7	.500	10	–	16	.385
Akron	5	–	9	.357	8	–	18	.308
Morehead State	4	–	10	.286	11	–	15	.423
Tennessee Tech	2	–	12	.143	6	–	20	.231
† 1981 OVC tournament winner Rankings from AP poll

The 1981 Ohio Valley Conference men's basketball tournament was the postseason men's basketball tournament of the Ohio Valley Conference during the 1980–81 NCAA Division I men's basketball season. It was held March 5–6, 1981. The semifinals and finals took place at E. A. Diddle Arena in Bowling Green, Kentucky. Top seed Western Kentucky won the tournament, defeating Murray State in the championship game, and received the Ohio Valley's automatic bid to the NCAA tournament. The Hilltoppers drew a 10 seed in the Mideast region, facing the 7 seed UAB.

== Format ==
The top four eligible men's basketball teams in the Ohio Valley Conference received a berth in the conference tournament. After the 14-game conference season, teams were seeded by conference record. The bottom four teams in the standings did not participate.

== Bracket ==
Semifinals; March 5
1	Western Kentucky	92
4	Austin Peay	71
3	Middle Tennessee	60
2	Murray State	62

Finals; March 6
1	Western Kentucky	81
2	Murray State	67
