= 1982 Ohio Valley Conference men's basketball tournament =

Men's Basketball Tournament

- Classification: Division I
- Season: 1981–82
- Teams: 4
- Site: E. A. Diddle Arena; Bowling Green, Kentucky
- Champions: Middle Tennessee State (3rd title)
- Winning coach: Stan Simpson (1st title)

1981–82 Ohio Valley Conference men's basketball standings
	Conf.				Overall
Team	W		L	PCT	W		L	PCT
Western Kentucky	13	–	3	.813	19	–	10	.655
Murray State	13	–	3	.813	20	–	8	.714
Middle Tennessee State †	12	–	4	.750	22	–	8	.733
Morehead State	11	–	5	.688	17	–	10	.630
Tennessee Tech	8	–	8	.500	12	–	14	.462
Youngstown State	5	–	11	.313	8	–	18	.308
Austin Peay	4	–	12	.250	6	–	20	.231
Akron	3	–	13	.188	7	–	19	.269
Eastern Kentucky	3	–	13	.188	5	–	21	.192
† 1982 OVC tournament winner Rankings from AP poll

The 1982 Ohio Valley Conference men's basketball tournament was the postseason men's basketball tournament of the Ohio Valley Conference during the 1981–82 NCAA Division I men's basketball season. It was held March 5–6, 1982. The semifinals and finals took place at E. A. Diddle Arena in Bowling Green, Kentucky. Three seed Middle Tennessee State won the tournament, defeating top seed Western Kentucky in the championship game, and received the Ohio Valley's automatic bid to the NCAA tournament. The Blue Raiders drew an 11 seed in the Mideast region, facing the 6 seed Kentucky. MTSU knocked off UK before falling to 3 seed and eventual Final Four participant Louisville.

== Format ==
The top four eligible men's basketball teams in the Ohio Valley Conference received a berth in the conference tournament. After the 16-game conference season, teams were seeded by conference record. The bottom four teams in the standings did not participate.

== Bracket ==
Semifinals; March 5
1	Western Kentucky	95
4	Morehead State	87
3	Middle Tennessee State	56
2	Murray State	54

Finals; March 6
1	Western Kentucky	52
3	Middle Tennessee State	54
