= 1986–87 Austin Peay Governors basketball team =

American college basketball season

1986–87 Austin Peay Governors men's basketball

Ohio Valley tournament champions

NCAA tournament, Second round
- Conference: Ohio Valley
- Record: 20–12 (8–6 OVC)
- Head coach: Lake Kelly (8th season)
- Assistant coach: Rick Stansbury (3rd season)
- Home arena: Winfield Dunn Center

1986–87 Ohio Valley Conference men's basketball standings
	Conf.				Overall
Team	W		L	PCT	W		L	PCT
Middle Tennessee	11	–	3	.786	22	–	7	.759
Akron	9	–	5	.643	21	–	9	.700
Eastern Kentucky	9	–	5	.643	19	–	11	.633
Austin Peay †	8	–	6	.571	14	–	14	.500
Morehead State	8	–	6	.571	14	–	14	.500
Murray State	6	–	8	.429	13	–	15	.464
Youngstown State	4	–	10	.286	11	–	17	.393
Tennessee Tech	1	–	13	.071	7	–	20	.259
† 1987 OVC tournament winner Rankings from AP poll

The 1986–87 Austin Peay Governors basketball team represented Austin Peay State University during the 1986–87 season. The Governors, led by eighth-year head coach Lake Kelly, played their home games at the Dunn Center in Clarksville, Tennessee as members of the Ohio Valley Conference.

After finishing fourth in the OVC regular season standings, Austin Peay won the OVC tournament to earn an automatic bid to the NCAA tournament. In the opening round, the Governors upset No. 3 seed Illinois, 68–67. It was the third upset of a No. 3 seed in the opening round by a No. 14 seed since the NCAA tournament expanded to a 64-team field in 1985. Austin Peay followed the win with another strong showing, but they fell to No. 6 seed and eventual Final Four participant Providence, 90–87 in OT. The team finished with a 20–12 record (8–6 OVC).

== Roster ==
1986–87 Austin Peay Governors men's basketball team
Players	Coaches
Pos. / # / Name / Height / Weight / Year / Hometown; G / / Lawrence Mitchell / 6 ft 3 in (1.91 m) / — / Sr	Head coach: Lake Kelly (Georgia Tech); Assistant coach(es): Rick Stansbury (Campbellsville); Legend: (C) Team captain; (S) Suspended; (I) Ineligible; (W) Walk-on; Injured; Current redshirt

== Schedule and results ==
Date time, TV	Rank^{#}	Opponent^{#}	Result	Record	Site city, state
Regular season
Nov 28, 1986*		Centre	L 83–85	0–1	Winfield Dunn Center; Clarksville, Tennessee
Nov 29, 1986*		at No. 11 Kentucky	L 69–71	0–2	Rupp Arena; Lexington, Kentucky
Dec 5, 1986*		vs. Alcorn State; Marshall Memorial Invitational	W 86–70	1–2	Cam Henderson Center; Huntington, West Virginia
Dec 6, 1986*		at Marshall; Marshall Memorial Invitational	W 73–68	2–2	Cam Henderson Center; Huntington, West Virginia
Dec 9, 1986*		at Rice	W 73–70	3–2	Tudor Fieldhouse; Houston, Texas
Dec 11, 1986*		at No. 7 Auburn	L 93–115	3–3	Beard–Eaves–Memorial Coliseum; Auburn, Alabama
Dec 13, 1986*		at Evansville	W 69–66	4–3	Roberts Municipal Stadium; Evansville, Indiana
Dec 16, 1986*		at Missouri	L 73–79	4–4	Hearnes Center; Columbia, Missouri
Dec 18, 1986*		at Minnesota	W 73–64	5–4	Williams Arena; Minneapolis, Minnesota
Jan 5, 1987*		Memphis State	L 67–82	8–5	Winfield Dunn Center; Clarksville, Tennessee
Feb 27, 1987		at Murray State	L 68–69	16–11 (8–6)	Racer Arena; Murray, Kentucky
Ohio Valley tournament
Mar 5, 1987*	(4)	(5) Morehead State; Quarterfinals	W 78–76	17–11	Murphy Athletic Center; Murfreesboro, Tennessee
Mar 6, 1987*	(4)	at (1) Middle Tennessee; Semifinals	W 87–83	18–11	Murphy Athletic Center; Murfreesboro, Tennessee
Mar 7, 1987*	(4)	vs. (3) Eastern Kentucky; Championship game	W 71–68	19–11	Murphy Athletic Center; Murfreesboro, Tennessee
NCAA tournament
Mar 12, 1987*	(14 SE)	vs. (3 SE) No. 11 Illinois; First round	W 68–67	20–11	Birmingham-Jefferson Civic Center; Birmingham, Alabama
Mar 14, 1987*	(14 SE)	vs. (6 SE) Providence; Second round	L 87–90 ^{OT}	20–12	Birmingham-Jefferson Civic Center; Birmingham, Alabama
*Non-conference game. ^{#}Rankings from AP Poll. (#) Tournament seedings in parentheses. SE=Southeast.
