= 1983–84 Morehead State Eagles men's basketball team =

American college basketball season

1983–84 Morehead State Eagles men's basketball

Ohio Valley Regular Season Champions Ohio Valley tournament champions

NCAA tournament, First round
- Conference: Ohio Valley Conference
- Record: 25–6 (12–2 OVC)
- Head coach: Wayne Martin
- Home arena: Ellis Johnson Arena

1983–84 Ohio Valley Conference men's basketball standings
	Conf.				Overall
Team	W		L	PCT	W		L	PCT
Morehead State †	12	–	2	.857	25	–	6	.806
Tennessee Tech	11	–	3	.786	18	–	10	.643
Youngstown State	9	–	5	.643	18	–	11	.621
Murray State	7	–	7	.500	15	–	13	.536
Austin Peay	5	–	9	.357	11	–	16	.407
Eastern Kentucky	5	–	9	.357	11	–	16	.407
Middle Tennessee	4	–	10	.286	11	–	16	.407
Akron	3	–	11	.214	8	–	19	.296
† 1984 OVC tournament winner Rankings from AP Poll

The 1983–84 Morehead State Eagles men's basketball team represented Morehead State University during the 1983–84 NCAA Division I men's basketball season. The Eagles, led by head coach Wayne Martin, played their home games at Ellis Johnson Arena and are members of the Ohio Valley Conference. They finished the season 25–6, 12–2 in Ohio Valley play and were champions of the 1984 Ohio Valley Conference men's basketball tournament to earn an automatic bid in the NCAA tournament. As a 12 seed, they won the play-in game over North Carolina A&T before falling to No. 5 seed Louisville in the first round.

== Roster ==
1983–84 Morehead State Eagles men's basketball team
Players	Coaches
Pos. / # / Name / Height / Weight / Year / Hometown; F / / Earl Harrison / 6 ft 7 in (2.01 m) / — / Sr	Head coach: Wayne Martin; Assistant coach(es) Legend: (C) Team captain; (S) Suspended; (I) Ineligible; (W) Walk-on; Injured; Current redshirt

== Schedule and results ==
Date time, TV	Rank^{#}	Opponent^{#}	Result	Record	Site (attendance) city, state
Regular season
Nov 26, 1983*		Tennessee Wesleyan	W 72–46	1–0	Ellis Johnson Arena; Morehead, Kentucky
Nov 28, 1983*		Lincoln Memorial	W 89–57	2–0	Ellis Johnson Arena; Morehead, Kentucky
Nov 30, 1983*		Alabama–Huntsville	W 89–55	3–0	Ellis Johnson Arena; Morehead, Kentucky
Dec 3, 1983*		at Kansas	L 57–75	3–1	Allen Fieldhouse; Lawrence, Kansas
Dec 7, 1983*		at Tennessee	L 63–75	3–2	Stokely Athletic Center; Knoxville, Tennessee
Dec 9, 1983*		Western Michigan	W 95–70	4–2	Ellis Johnson Arena; Morehead, Kentucky
Dec 15, 1983*		Marshall	W 81–78	5–2	Ellis Johnson Arena; Morehead, Kentucky
Dec 19, 1983*		at Western Michigan	W 77–60	6–2	University Arena; Kalamazoo, Michigan
Jan 2, 1984*		at Louisville	L 50–85	6–3	Freedom Hall; Louisville, Kentucky
Jan 4, 1984*		at Tennessee State	W 68–67	7–3	Gentry Complex; Nashville, Tennessee
Jan 12, 1984		Middle Tennessee State	L 54–57	7–4 (0–1)	Ellis Johnson Arena; Morehead, Kentucky
Jan 13, 1984		Tennessee Tech	W 79–72	8–4 (1–1)	Ellis Johnson Arena; Morehead, Kentucky
Jan 19, 1984		at Austin Peay	W 74–59	9–4 (2–1)	Dunn Center; Clarksville, Tennessee
Jan 21, 1984		at Murray State	W 87–76	10–4 (3–1)	Racer Arena; Murray, Kentucky
Jan 26, 1984		at Youngstown State	W 88–77	11–4 (4–1)	Beeghly Center; Youngstown, Ohio
Jan 28, 1984		at Akron	W 86–78	12–4 (5–1)	James A. Rhodes Arena; Akron, Ohio
Jan 31, 1984*		Western Kentucky	W 69–65	13–4	Ellis Johnson Arena; Morehead, Kentucky
Feb 4, 1984		at Eastern Kentucky	W 65–60	14–4 (6–1)	McBrayer Arena; Richmond, Kentucky
Feb 6, 1984*		Tennessee State	W 73–62	15–4	Ellis Johnson Arena; Morehead, Kentucky
Feb 9, 1984		Youngstown State	W 88–64	16–4 (7–1)	Ellis Johnson Arena; Morehead, Kentucky
Feb 11, 1984*		Akron	W 93–74	17–4 (8–1)	Ellis Johnson Arena; Morehead, Kentucky
Feb 13, 1984*		Indiana University Southeast	W 78–74 ^{OT}	15–4	Ellis Johnson Arena; Morehead, Kentucky
Feb 16, 1984		at Middle Tennessee State	W 88–73	18–4 (9–1)	Murphy Center; Murfreesboro, Tennessee
Feb 18, 1984		at Tennessee Tech	L 62–70	19–5 (9–2)	Eblen Center; Cookeville, Tennessee
Feb 23, 1984		Austin Peay	W 85–75	20–5 (10–2)	Ellis Johnson Arena; Morehead, Kentucky
Feb 25, 1984		Murray State	W 71–64	21–5 (11–2)	Ellis Johnson Arena; Morehead, Kentucky
Mar 2, 1984		Eastern Kentucky	W 76–68	22–5 (12–2)	Ellis Johnson Arena; Morehead, Kentucky
Ohio Valley Conference Basketball tournament
Mar 8, 1984*		Murray State; Semifinals	W 80–64	23–5	Ellis Johnson Arena; Morehead, Kentucky
Mar 9, 1984*		Youngstown State; Championship game	W 47–44	24–5	Ellis Johnson Arena; Morehead, Kentucky
NCAA tournament
Mar 13, 1984*		vs. North Carolina A&T; Play-in game	W 70–69	25–5	University of Dayton Arena; Dayton, Ohio
Mar 16, 1984*		vs. Louisville; First round	L 59–72	25–6	MECCA Arena; Milwaukee, Wisconsin
*Non-conference game. ^{#}Rankings from AP Poll. (#) Tournament seedings in parentheses. All times are in Eastern Time.
