= 1985 Ohio Valley Conference men's basketball tournament =

- Classification: Division I
- Season: 1984–85
- Teams: 7
- Site: Murphy Center; Murfreesboro, Tennessee
- Champions: Middle Tennessee (4th title)
- Winning coach: Bruce Stewart (1st title)

1984–85 Ohio Valley Conference men's basketball standings
	Conf.				Overall
Team	W		L	PCT	W		L	PCT
Tennessee Tech	11	–	3	.786	19	–	9	.679
Eastern Kentucky	9	–	5	.643	16	–	13	.552
Youngstown State	9	–	5	.643	19	–	11	.633
Murray State	8	–	6	.571	19	–	9	.679
Middle Tennessee †	7	–	7	.500	17	–	14	.548
Akron	6	–	8	.429	12	–	14	.462
Austin Peay	4	–	10	.286	8	–	19	.296
Morehead State	2	–	12	.143	7	–	20	.259
† 1985 OVC tournament winner Rankings from AP Poll

The 1985 Ohio Valley Conference men's basketball tournament was the final event of the 1984–85 season in the Ohio Valley Conference. The tournament was held March 1–3, 1985, at the Murphy Center in Murfreesboro, Tennessee.

Middle Tennessee State defeated Youngstown State in the championship game, 66–63, to win their third OVC men's basketball tournament.

The Blue Raiders received an automatic bid to the 1985 NCAA tournament as the No. 15 seed in the Southeast region.

== Bracket ==
Quarterfinals; Tuesday, March 1
4	Murray State	60
5	Middle Tennessee	63
3	Eastern Kentucky	75
6	Austin Peay	66
2	Youngstown State	79
7	Morehead State	74

Semifinals; Wednesday, March 2
1	Tennessee Tech	52
5	Middle Tennessee	54
3	Eastern Kentucky	61
2	Youngstown State	95

Championship; Thursday, March 3
5	Middle Tennessee	66
2	Youngstown State	63
