= 1997–98 Murray State Racers men's basketball team =

American college basketball season

1997–98 Murray State Racers men's basketball

Ohio Valley Regular season champions Ohio Valley tournament champions

NCAA tournament, first round
- Conference: Ohio Valley Conference

Ranking
- AP: No. 25
- Record: 29–4 (16–2 OVC)
- Head coach: Mark Gottfried (3rd season)
- Home arena: Racer Arena

1997–98 Ohio Valley Conference men's basketball standings
	Conf.				Overall
Team	W		L	PCT	W		L	PCT
No. 25 Murray State †	16	–	2	.889	29	–	4	.879
Eastern Illinois	13	–	5	.722	16	–	11	.593
Middle Tennessee	12	–	6	.667	19	–	9	.679
Austin Peay	11	–	7	.611	17	–	11	.607
Southeast Missouri State	10	–	8	.556	14	–	13	.519
Tennessee State	8	–	10	.444	13	–	16	.448
Eastern Kentucky	8	–	10	.444	10	–	17	.370
Tennessee Tech	5	–	13	.278	9	–	21	.300
UT Martin	5	–	13	.278	7	–	20	.259
Morehead State	2	–	16	.111	3	–	23	.115
† 1998 OVC tournament winner Rankings from AP Poll

The 1997–98 Murray State Racers men's basketball team represented Murray State University during the 1997–98 NCAA Division I men's basketball season. The Racers, led by third-year head coach Mark Gottfried, played their home games at Racer Arena in Murray, Kentucky, as members of the Ohio Valley Conference. They finished the season 29–4, 16–2 in OVC play to win the OVC regular season title. They defeated Austin Peay to win the OVC tournament to advance to the NCAA tournament. As No. 9 seed in the Midwest region, the Racers were beaten by No. 8 seed and eventual Elite Eight participant Rhode Island, 97–74.

== Roster ==
1997–98 Murray State Racers men's basketball team
Players
Coaches

Pos.	#	Name	Height	Weight	Year	Hometown
G	10	Chad Townsend	—	—	Sr
G	12	Aubrey Reese	6 ft 0 in (1.83 m)	185 lb (84 kg)	So	Auburn, Alabama
F	31	Isaac Spencer	6 ft 6 in (1.98 m)	205 lb (93 kg)	Fr	Montgomery, Alabama
G	51	De'Teri Mayes	6 ft 3 in (1.91 m)	—	Sr	Montgomery, Alabama

Head coach

- Mark Gottfried (Alabama)

Assistant coach(es)

Legend

- (C) Team captain
- (S) Suspended
- (I) Ineligible
- (W) Walk-on
- Injured
- Current redshirt

== Schedule and results ==
Date time, TV	Rank^{#}	Opponent^{#}	Result	Record	Site (attendance) city, state
Regular season
Dec 18, 1997*		Campbellsville	W 112–70		Racer Arena; Murray, Kentucky
Dec 21, 1997*		at Western Kentucky	W 86–75		E. A. Diddle Arena; Bowling Green, Kentucky
Dec 25, 1997*		vs. No. 12 Arkansas; Puerto Rico Holiday Classic	W 94–83		Eugene Guerra Sports Complex; San Juan, Puerto Rico
Dec 26, 1997*; 2:00 p.m.		vs. Iowa State; Puerto Rico Holiday Classic	W 84–76 ^{OT}		Eugene Guerra Sports Complex (500); San Juan, Puerto Rico
Jan 3, 1998		at Middle Tennessee	L 71–76 ^{OT}		Murfreesboro, Tennessee
Jan 10, 1998		at Tennessee-Martin	W 67–56		Kathleen and Tom Elam Center; Martin, Tennessee
Jan 29, 1998		Middle Tennessee	W 78–75		Racer Arena; Murray, Kentucky
Feb 7, 1998		Tennessee-Martin	W 94–66		Racer Arena; Murray, Kentucky
Ohio Valley Conference tournament
Feb 24, 1998*	(1)	(8) Tennessee Tech; Quarterfinals	W 84–63	27–3	Racer Arena; Murray, Kentucky
Feb 28, 1998*	(1)	vs. (4) Austin Peay; Semifinals	W 81–56	28–3	Gaylord Entertainment Center; Nashville, Tennessee
Mar 1, 1998*	(1)	vs. (7) Tennessee State; Championship game	W 92–69	29–3	Gaylord Entertainment Center; Nashville, Tennessee
NCAA tournament
Mar 13, 1998*	(9 MW) No. 25	vs. (8 MW) Rhode Island; First round	L 74–97	29–4	Myriad Convention Center; Oklahoma City, Oklahoma
*Non-conference game. ^{#}Rankings from AP Poll. (#) Tournament seedings in parentheses. MW=Midwest. All times are in Central Time.

== Awards and honors ==
- De'Teri Mayes – OVC Player of the Year
