= 1984 Ohio Valley Conference men's basketball tournament =

Men's Basketball Tournament

- Classification: Division I
- Season: 1983–84
- Teams: 4
- Site: Ellis Johnson Arena; Morehead, Kentucky
- Champions: Morehead State Eagles (2nd title)
- Winning coach: Wayne Martin (2nd title)

1983–84 Ohio Valley Conference men's basketball standings
	Conf.				Overall
Team	W		L	PCT	W		L	PCT
Morehead State †	12	–	2	.857	25	–	6	.806
Tennessee Tech	11	–	3	.786	18	–	10	.643
Youngstown State	9	–	5	.643	18	–	11	.621
Murray State	7	–	7	.500	15	–	13	.536
Austin Peay	5	–	9	.357	11	–	16	.407
Eastern Kentucky	5	–	9	.357	11	–	16	.407
Middle Tennessee	4	–	10	.286	11	–	16	.407
Akron	3	–	11	.214	8	–	19	.296
† 1984 OVC tournament winner Rankings from AP Poll

The 1984 Ohio Valley Conference men's basketball tournament was the postseason men's basketball tournament of the Ohio Valley Conference during the 1983–84 NCAA Division I men's basketball season. It was held March 8–9, 1984. The semifinals and finals took place at Gaylord Entertainment Center in Nashville, Tennessee. Two seed Southeast Missouri State won the tournament, defeating Murray State in the championship game, and received the Ohio Valley's automatic bid to the NCAA tournament. Southeast Missouri State drew a 13 seed in the West region, facing the 4 seed LSU.

== Format ==
The top four eligible men's basketball teams in the Ohio Valley Conference received a berth in the conference tournament. After the 14-game conference season, teams were seeded by conference record. The bottom four teams in the standings did not participate.

== Bracket ==
Semifinals; March 8
1	Morehead State	80
4	Murray State	64
3	Youngstown State	63
2	Tennessee Tech	55

Finals; March 9
1	Morehead State	47
3	Youngstown State	44
