= 1981–82 Middle Tennessee Blue Raiders men's basketball team =

American college basketball season

1981–82 Middle Tennessee Blue Raiders men's basketball

OVC tournament champions Rick Campbell, All OVC tournament team Jerry Beck All OVC tournament team

NCAA tournament Rick Campbell Led MTSU in scoring with 19 points Jerry Beck 14 points 10 rebounds, Second Round
- Conference: Ohio Valley Conference
- Record: 22–8 (12–4 OVC)
- Head coach: Stan Simpson (3rd season)
- Home arena: Murphy Center

1981–82 Ohio Valley Conference men's basketball standings
	Conf.				Overall
Team	W		L	PCT	W		L	PCT
Western Kentucky	13	–	3	.813	19	–	10	.655
Murray State	13	–	3	.813	20	–	8	.714
Middle Tennessee State †	12	–	4	.750	22	–	8	.733
Morehead State	11	–	5	.688	17	–	10	.630
Tennessee Tech	8	–	8	.500	12	–	14	.462
Youngstown State	5	–	11	.313	8	–	18	.308
Austin Peay	4	–	12	.250	6	–	20	.231
Akron	3	–	13	.188	7	–	19	.269
Eastern Kentucky	3	–	13	.188	5	–	21	.192
† 1982 OVC tournament winner Rankings from AP poll

The 1981–82 Middle Tennessee Blue Raiders men's basketball team represented Middle Tennessee State University during the 1981–82 NCAA Division I men's basketball season. The Blue Raiders, led by third-year head coach Stan Simpson, played their home games at the Murphy Center in Murfreesboro, Tennessee, and were members of the Ohio Valley Conference. They finished the season 22–8, 12–4 in OVC play to finish third in the regular season standings. In the OVC tournament, they defeated, Murray State and Western Kentucky and to receive the conference's automatic bid to the NCAA tournament. As the No. 11 seed in the Mideast region, they upset No. 6 seed Kentucky, 50–44, Rick Campbell Led MTSU with 19 points and Jerry Beck with 14 points 10 rebounds in the opening round before losing to No. 3 seed, and eventual Final Four participant, Louisville, 81–56.

== Roster ==
1981–82 Middle Tennessee Blue Raiders men's basketball team
Players	Coaches
Pos. / # / Name / Height / Weight / Year / Previous school / Hometown; F / 44 / Jerry Beck / 6 ft 7 in (2.01 m) / 200 lb (91 kg) / Sr / George Washington / Danville, Virginia	Head coach: Stan Simpson; Assistant coach(es) Legend: (C) Team captain; (S) Suspended; (I) Ineligible; (W) Walk-on; Injured; Current redshirt

== Schedule and results ==
Date time, TV	Rank^{#}	Opponent^{#}	Result	Record	Site (attendance) city, state
Regular season
Nov 27, 1981*		vs. Chattanooga; Coors Classic	L 54–62	0–1	Gentry Complex; Nashville, Tennessee
Nov 28, 1981*		vs. Austin Peay; Coors Classic	W 54–51	1–1	Gentry Complex; Nashville, Tennessee
Dec 3, 1981*		South Alabama	W 71–69 ^{OT}	2–1	Murphy Center; Murfreesboro, Tennessee
Dec 5, 1981*		Tennessee State	L 55–60	2–2	Murphy Center; Murfreesboro, Tennessee
Dec 10, 1981		at Morehead State	W 64–59	3–2 (1–0)	Ellis Johnson Arena; Morehead, Kentucky
Dec 12, 1981		at Eastern Kentucky	W 69–51	4–2 (2–0)	Alumni Coliseum; Richmond, Kentucky
Dec 17, 1981*		Georgia State	W 62–49	5–2	Murphy Center; Murfreesboro, Tennessee
Dec 19, 1981		Tennessee Tech	W 88–63	6–2 (3–0)	Murphy Center; Murfreesboro, Tennessee
Dec 21, 1981*		Samford	W 67–63 ^{OT}	7–2	Murphy Center; Murfreesboro, Tennessee
Dec 30, 1981*		Detroit	W 64–62 ^{OT}	8–2	Murphy Center; Murfreesboro, Tennessee
Jan 4, 1982*		at Xavier	W 69–48	9–2	Schmidt Fieldhouse; Cincinnati, Ohio
Jan 7, 1982		Akron	W 83–62	10–2 (4–0)	Murphy Center; Murfreesboro, Tennessee
Jan 9, 1982		Youngstown State	W 73–56	11–2 (5–0)	Murphy Center; Murfreesboro, Tennessee
Jan 14, 1982		at Western Kentucky	L 49–65	11–3 (5–1)	E. A. Diddle Arena; Bowling Green, Kentucky
Jan 16, 1982*		at Tennessee State	W 70–68 ^{OT}	12–3	Gentry Complex; Nashville, Tennessee
Jan 21, 1982		Murray State	L 58–59	12–4 (5–2)	Murphy Center; Murfreesboro, Tennessee
Jan 23, 1982		Austin Peay	W 64–52	13–4 (6–2)	Murphy Center; Murfreesboro, Tennessee
Jan 27, 1982*		at Oral Roberts	L 73–83	13–5	Mabee Center; Tulsa, Oklahoma
Jan 30, 1982		at Tennessee Tech	L 61–75	13–6 (6–3)	Eblen Center; Cookeville, Tennessee
Feb 4, 1982		at Akron	W 65–53	14–6 (7–3)	James A. Rhodes Arena; Akron, Ohio
Feb 6, 1982		at Youngstown State	W 73–67	15–6 (8–3)	Beeghly Center; Youngstown, Ohio
Feb 13, 1982		Western Kentucky	L 64–75	15–7 (8–4)	Murphy Center; Murfreesboro, Tennessee
Feb 18, 1982		at Murray State	W 70–53	16–7 (9–4)	Racer Arena; Murray, Kentucky
Feb 20, 1982		at Austin Peay	W 67–56	17–7 (10–4)	Dunn Center; Clarksville, Tennessee
Feb 25, 1982		Morehead State	W 63–52	18–7 (11–4)	Murphy Center; Murfreesboro, Tennessee
Feb 27, 1982		Eastern Kentucky	W 62–55	19–7 (12–4)	Murphy Center; Murfreesboro, Tennessee
OVC tournament
Mar 5, 1982*	(3)	vs. (2) Murray State; Semifinals	W 56–54 ^{OT}	20–7	E. A. Diddle Arena; Bowling Green, Kentucky
Mar 6, 1982*	(3)	at (1) Western Kentucky; Championship game	W 54–52	21–7	E. A. Diddle Arena; Bowling Green, Kentucky
NCAA tournament
Mar 11, 1982*	(11 ME)	vs. (6 ME) No. 15 Kentucky; First round	W 50–44	22–7	Memorial Gymnasium; Nashville, Tennessee
Mar 13, 1982*	(11 ME)	vs. (3 ME) No. 20 Louisville; Second round	L 56–81	22–8	Memorial Gymnasium; Nashville, Tennessee
*Non-conference game. ^{#}Rankings from AP Poll. (#) Tournament seedings in parentheses. ME=Mideast Source. All times are in Central Time.

== Awards and honors ==
- Jerry Beck – OVC Player of the Year (2x)
