= 1988–89 Middle Tennessee Blue Raiders men's basketball team =

American college basketball season

1988–89 Middle Tennessee Blue Raiders men's basketball

OVC regular season & tournament champions

NCAA tournament, second round
- Conference: Ohio Valley Conference
- Record: 23–8 (10–2 OVC)
- Head coach: Bruce Stewart (5th season)
- Home arena: Murphy Center

1988–89 Ohio Valley Conference men's basketball standings
	Conf.				Overall
Team	W		L	PCT	W		L	PCT
Middle Tennessee †	10	–	2	.833	23	–	8	.742
Murray State	10	–	2	.833	19	–	11	.633
Austin Peay	8	–	4	.667	18	–	12	.600
Morehead State	5	–	7	.417	15	–	16	.484
Eastern Kentucky	4	–	8	.333	7	–	22	.241
Tennessee Tech	3	–	9	.250	10	–	20	.333
Tennessee State	2	–	10	.167	4	–	24	.143
† 1989 OVC tournament winner Rankings from AP Poll

The 1988–89 Middle Tennessee Blue Raiders men's basketball team represented Middle Tennessee State University during the 1988–89 NCAA Division I men's basketball season. The Blue Raiders, led by fifth-year head coach Bruce Stewart, played their home games at the Murphy Center in Murfreesboro, Tennessee, and were members of the Ohio Valley Conference. They finished the season 23–8, 10–2 in OVC play to win the regular season championship. In the OVC tournament, they defeated Eastern Kentucky and Austin Peay to receive the conference's automatic bid to the NCAA tournament. As the No. 13 seed in the Southeast region, they defeated Florida State in the first round before losing in the second round to Virginia.

== Roster ==
1988–89 Middle Tennessee Blue Raiders men's basketball team
Players
Coaches

Pos.	#	Name	Height	Weight	Year	Previous school	Hometown
G		Chris Rainey	5 ft 11 in (1.8 m)	—	Sr
F		Randy Henry	6 ft 9 in (2.06 m)	—	Sr

Head coach

- Bruce Stewart

Assistant coach(es)

Legend

- (C) Team captain
- (S) Suspended
- (I) Ineligible
- (W) Walk-on
- Injured
- Current redshirt

== Schedule and results ==
Date time, TV	Rank^{#}	Opponent^{#}	Result	Record	Site (attendance) city, state
Non-conference regular season
Nov 28, 1988*		Kennesaw State	W 93–56	1–0	Murphy Athletic Center; Murfreesboro, Tennessee
Dec 3, 1988*		at Wright State	L 71–88	1–1	WSU Physical Education Building; Dayton, Ohio
Dec 5, 1988*		at Akron	L 65–81	1–2	James A. Rhodes Arena; Akron, Ohio
Dec 8, 1988*		Tennessee Wesleyan	W 143–68	2–2	Murphy Athletic Center; Murfreesboro, Tennessee
Dec 10, 1988*		Alabama State	W 111–83	3–2	Murphy Athletic Center; Murfreesboro, Tennessee
Dec 17, 1988*		at Chattanooga	W 88–87	4–2	McKenzie Arena; Chattanooga, Tennessee
Dec 20, 1988*		Louisiana Tech	W 91–87	5–2	Murphy Athletic Center; Murfreesboro, Tennessee
Dec 22, 1988*		Arkansas State	W 93–92 ^{2OT}	6–2	Murphy Athletic Center; Murfreesboro, Tennessee
Dec 27, 1988*		vs. Clemson; Far West Classic Quarterfinal	L 77–81	6–3	Memorial Coliseum; Portland, Oregon
Dec 29, 1988*		vs. Chicago State; Far West Classic	W 85–71	7–3	Memorial Coliseum; Portland, Oregon
Dec 30, 1988*		vs. Colorado; Far West Classic	W 107–105 ^{OT}	8–3	Memorial Coliseum; Portland, Oregon
Jan 4, 1989*		at Alabama State	L 96–102	8–4	Dunn Arena; Montgomery, Alabama
Jan 7, 1989*		Akron	W 99–94	9–4	Murphy Athletic Center; Murfreesboro, Tennessee
Regular season
Jan 9, 1989		Tennessee State	W 89–60	10–4 (1–0)	Murphy Athletic Center; Murfreesboro, Tennessee
Jan 12, 1989*		at Louisiana Tech	L 71–72	10–5	Thomas Assembly Center; Ruston, Louisiana
Jan 16, 1989		at Tennessee Tech	W 79–77	11–5 (2–0)	Eblen Center; Cookeville, Tennessee
Jan 21, 1989		Eastern Kentucky	W 82–67	12–5 (3–0)	Murphy Athletic Center; Murfreesboro, Tennessee
Jan 23, 1989		Morehead State	W 108–68	13–5 (4–0)	Murphy Athletic Center; Murfreesboro, Tennessee
Jan 28, 1989		at Austin Peay	W 95–84	14–5 (5–0)	Winfield Dunn Center; Clarksville, Tennessee
Jan 30, 1989		at Murray State	L 67–71	14–6 (5–1)	Racer Arena; Murray, Kentucky
Feb 4, 1989		at Tennessee State	W 104–71	15–6 (6–1)	Gentry Complex; Nashville, Tennessee
Feb 8, 1989*		Wright State	W 83–51	16–6	Murphy Athletic Center; Murfreesboro, Tennessee
Feb 11, 1989		Murray State	W 85–84	17–6 (7–1)	Murphy Athletic Center; Murfreesboro, Tennessee
Feb 13, 1989		Austin Peay	W 111–105 ^{OT}	18–6 (8–1)	Murphy Athletic Center; Murfreesboro, Tennessee
Feb 18, 1989		at Morehead State	L 99–101	18–7 (8–2)	Ellis Johnson Arena; Morehead, Kentucky
Feb 20, 1989		at Eastern Kentucky	W 81–63	19–7 (9–2)	McBrayer Arena; Richmond, Kentucky
Feb 25, 1989		Tennessee Tech	W 89–68	20–7 (10–2)	Murphy Athletic Center; Murfreesboro, Tennessee
OVC tournament
Mar 5, 1989*	(1)	vs. (5) Eastern Kentucky; Semifinals	W 81–64	21–7	Nashville Municipal Auditorium; Nashville, Tennessee
Mar 9, 1989*	(1)	vs. (3) Austin Peay; Championship	W 82–79	22–7	Nashville Municipal Auditorium; Nashville, Tennessee
NCAA tournament
Mar 16, 1989*	(13 SE)	vs. (4 SE) No. 16 Florida State; First Round	W 97–83	23–7	Memorial Gymnasium; Nashville, Tennessee
Mar 18, 1989*	(13 SE)	vs. (5 SE) Virginia; Second Round	L 88–104	23–8	Memorial Gymnasium (13,453); Nashville, Tennessee
*Non-conference game. ^{#}Rankings from AP Poll. (#) Tournament seedings in parentheses. SE=Southeast Source. All times are in Central Time.
