= 1984–85 Middle Tennessee Blue Raiders men's basketball team =

American college basketball season

1984–85 Middle Tennessee Blue Raiders men's basketball

OVC tournament champions

NCAA tournament, First Round
- Conference: Ohio Valley Conference
- Record: 17–14 (7–7 OVC)
- Head coach: Bruce Stewart (1st season)
- Home arena: Murphy Center

1984–85 Ohio Valley Conference men's basketball standings
	Conf.				Overall
Team	W		L	PCT	W		L	PCT
Tennessee Tech	11	–	3	.786	19	–	9	.679
Eastern Kentucky	9	–	5	.643	16	–	13	.552
Youngstown State	9	–	5	.643	19	–	11	.633
Murray State	8	–	6	.571	19	–	9	.679
Middle Tennessee †	7	–	7	.500	17	–	14	.548
Akron	6	–	8	.429	12	–	14	.462
Austin Peay	4	–	10	.286	8	–	19	.296
Morehead State	2	–	12	.143	7	–	20	.259
† 1985 OVC tournament winner Rankings from AP Poll

The 1984–85 Middle Tennessee Blue Raiders men's basketball team represented Middle Tennessee State University during the 1984–85 NCAA Division I men's basketball season. The Blue Raiders, led by first-year head coach Bruce Stewart, played their home games at the Murphy Center in Murfreesboro, Tennessee and were members of the Ohio Valley Conference. They finished the season 17–14, 7–7 in OVC play to finish 5th in the regular season standings. In the OVC tournament, they defeated Murray State, Tennessee Tech, and Youngstown State to receive the conference's automatic bid to the NCAA tournament. As the No. 15 seed in the West region, they were defeated by No. 2 seed North Carolina, 76–57, in the opening round.

== Roster ==
1984–85 Middle Tennessee Blue Raiders men's basketball team
Players	Coaches
Pos. / # / Name / Height / Weight / Year / Previous school / Hometown; G / / Kim Cooksey / 6 ft 3 in (1.91 m) / — / Jr	Head coach: Bruce Stewart; Assistant coach(es) Legend: (C) Team captain; (S) Suspended; (I) Ineligible; (W) Walk-on; Injured; Current redshirt

== Schedule and results ==
Date time, TV	Rank^{#}	Opponent^{#}	Result	Record	Site (attendance) city, state
Regular season
Nov 23, 1984*		Georgia College	W 65–63 ^{OT}	1–0	Murphy Center; Murfreesboro, Tennessee
Nov 30, 1984*		vs. Tennessee State; Coca-Cola Classic	W 80–60	2–0	McKenzie Arena; Chattanooga, Tennessee
Dec 1, 1984*		at Chattanooga; Coca-Cola Classic	L 69–71	2–1	McKenzie Arena; Chattanooga, Tennessee
Dec 3, 1984*		at Vanderbilt	L 82–94	2–2	Memorial Gymnasium; Nashville, Tennessee
Dec 5, 1984*		at No. 5 Memphis State	L 77–90	2–3	Mid-South Coliseum; Memphis, Tennessee
Dec 8, 1984*		Miles College	W 103–69	3–3	Murphy Center; Murfreesboro, Tennessee
Dec 15, 1984*		at Clemson	L 75–81	3–4	Littlejohn Coliseum; Clemson, South Carolina
Dec 19, 1984*		Urbana	W 87–66	4–4	Murphy Center; Murfreesboro, Tennessee
Dec 23, 1984*		Western Kentucky	L 50–60	4–5	Murphy Center; Murfreesboro, Tennessee
Jan 5, 1985*		Cumberland	W 79–55	5–5	Murphy Center; Murfreesboro, Tennessee
Jan 7, 1985		Tennessee Tech	L 64–70	5–6 (0–1)	Murphy Center; Murfreesboro, Tennessee
Jan 12, 1985		Morehead State	W 75–63	6–6 (1–1)	Murphy Center; Murfreesboro, Tennessee
Jan 14, 1985*		Eastern Kentucky	W 45–43	7–6 (2–1)	Murphy Center; Murfreesboro, Tennessee
Jan 19, 1985*		at Youngstown State	L 54–57	7–7 (2–2)	Beeghly Center; Youngstown, Ohio
Jan 21, 1985*		at Akron	L 64–80	7–8 (2–3)	James A. Rhodes Arena; Akron, Ohio
Jan 26, 1985*		at Austin Peay	W 84–68	8–8 (3–3)	Dunn Center; Clarksville, Tennessee
Jan 28, 1985*		at Murray State	L 59–63	8–9 (3–4)	Racer Arena; Murray, Kentucky
Jan 30, 1985*		at Georgia Southern	L 64–72	8–10	Hanner Fieldhouse; Statesboro, Georgia
Feb 2, 1985*		Tennessee State	W 60–59	9–10	Murphy Center; Murfreesboro, Tennessee
Feb 4, 1985		at Tennessee Tech	L 70–74	9–11 (3–5)	Eblen Center; Cookeville, Tennessee
Feb 25, 1985		Akron	W 71–63	14–13 (7–7)	Murphy Center; Murfreesboro, Tennessee
OVC tournament
Mar 1, 1985*		Murray State; Quarterfinals	W 63–60	15–13	Murphy Center; Murfreesboro, Tennessee
Mar 2, 1985*		Tennessee Tech; Semifinals	W 54–52	16–13	Murphy Center; Murfreesboro, Tennessee
Mar 3, 1985*		Youngstown State; Championship game	W 66–63	17–13	Murphy Center; Murfreesboro, Tennessee
NCAA tournament
Mar 14, 1985*	(15 SE)	vs. (2 SE) No. 7 North Carolina; First round	L 57–76	17–14	Athletic & Convocation Center; South Bend, Indiana
*Non-conference game. ^{#}Rankings from AP Poll. (#) Tournament seedings in parentheses. SE=Southeast Source. All times are in Central Time.
