= 1987 Ohio Valley Conference men's basketball tournament =

Final event of 1986–87 Ohio Valley Conference: 1987 basketball tournament recap

- Classification: Division I
- Season: 1986–87
- Teams: 7
- Site: Murphy Center; Murfreesboro, Tennessee
- Champions: Austin Peay (1st title)
- Winning coach: Lake Kelly (1st title)

1986–87 Ohio Valley Conference men's basketball standings
	Conf.				Overall
Team	W		L	PCT	W		L	PCT
Middle Tennessee	11	–	3	.786	22	–	7	.759
Akron	9	–	5	.643	21	–	9	.700
Eastern Kentucky	9	–	5	.643	19	–	11	.633
Austin Peay †	8	–	6	.571	14	–	14	.500
Morehead State	8	–	6	.571	14	–	14	.500
Murray State	6	–	8	.429	13	–	15	.464
Youngstown State	4	–	10	.286	11	–	17	.393
Tennessee Tech	1	–	13	.071	7	–	20	.259
† 1987 OVC tournament winner Rankings from AP poll

The 1987 Ohio Valley Conference men's basketball tournament was the final event of the 1986–87 season in the Ohio Valley Conference. The tournament was held March 5–7, 1987, at the Murphy Center in Murfreesboro, Tennessee.

Austin Peay defeated Eastern Kentucky in the championship game, 71–68, to win their third OVC men's basketball tournament.

The Governors received an automatic bid to the 1987 NCAA tournament as the No. 14 seed in the Southeast region.

== Bracket ==
Quarterfinals; Tuesday, March 5
4	Austin Peay	78
5	Morehead State	76
3	Eastern Kentucky	89
6	Murray State	75
2	Akron	103
7	Youngstown State	74

Semifinals; Wednesday, March 6
1	Middle Tennessee	83
4	Austin Peay	87
3	Eastern Kentucky	94
2	Akron	85

Championship; Thursday, March 7
4	Austin Peay	71
3	Eastern Kentucky	68
