= 1986–87 Middle Tennessee Blue Raiders men's basketball team =

American college basketball season

1986–87 Middle Tennessee Blue Raiders men's basketball

OVC Regular season champions

NCAA tournament, First Round
- Conference: Ohio Valley Conference
- Record: 22–7 (11–3 OVC)
- Head coach: Bruce Stewart (3rd season)
- Home arena: Murphy Center

1986–87 Ohio Valley Conference men's basketball standings
	Conf.				Overall
Team	W		L	PCT	W		L	PCT
Middle Tennessee	11	–	3	.786	22	–	7	.759
Akron	9	–	5	.643	21	–	9	.700
Eastern Kentucky	9	–	5	.643	19	–	11	.633
Austin Peay †	8	–	6	.571	14	–	14	.500
Morehead State	8	–	6	.571	14	–	14	.500
Murray State	6	–	8	.429	13	–	15	.464
Youngstown State	4	–	10	.286	11	–	17	.393
Tennessee Tech	1	–	13	.071	7	–	20	.259
† 1987 OVC tournament winner Rankings from AP poll

The 1986–87 Middle Tennessee Blue Raiders men's basketball team represented Middle Tennessee State University during the 1986–87 NCAA Division I men's basketball season. The Blue Raiders, led by first-year head coach Bruce Stewart, played their home games at the Murphy Center in Murfreesboro, Tennessee and were members of the Ohio Valley Conference. They finished the season 22–7, 11–3 in OVC play to finish atop the regular season standings. In the OVC tournament, they were upset by Austin Peay in the semifinals, but did receive an at-large bid to the NCAA tournament. As the No. 12 seed in the West region, they were defeated by No. 5 seed Notre Dame, 84–71, in the opening round.

== Roster ==
1986–87 Middle Tennessee Blue Raiders men's basketball team
Players	Coaches
Pos. / # / Name / Height / Weight / Year / Previous school / Hometown; G / / Duane Washington / 6 ft 4 in (1.93 m) / 190 lb (86 kg) / Sr	Head coach: Bruce Stewart; Assistant coach(es) Legend: (C) Team captain; (S) Suspended; (I) Ineligible; (W) Walk-on; Injured; Current redshirt

== Schedule and results ==
Date time, TV	Rank^{#}	Opponent^{#}	Result	Record	Site (attendance) city, state
Regular season
Dec 20, 1986*		at Marshall	L 85–87	3–1	Cam Henderson Center; Huntington, West Virginia
Dec 29, 1986*		vs. Michigan; UAB Classic	W 85–83	5–1	Birmingham-Jefferson Civic Center; Birmingham, Alabama
Dec 30, 1986*		at UAB; UAB Classic	L 91–93 ^{OT}	5–2	Birmingham-Jefferson Civic Center; Birmingham, Alabama
OVC tournament
Mar 6, 1987*		Austin Peay; Semifinals	L 83–87	19–6	Murphy Center; Murfreesboro, Tennessee
NCAA tournament
Mar 12, 1987*	(12 E)	vs. (5 E) No. 18 Notre Dame; First round	L 71–84	22–7	Charlotte Coliseum; Charlotte, North Carolina
*Non-conference game. ^{#}Rankings from AP Poll. (#) Tournament seedings in parentheses. E=East Source. All times are in Central Time.
