= Austin Peay Governors men's basketball =

Men's college basketball team

2026–27 Austin Peay Governors men's basketball team
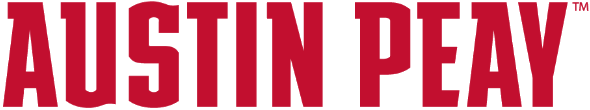
- University: Austin Peay State University
- Head coach: Corey Gipson (4th season)
- Location: Clarksville, Tennessee
- Arena: F&M Bank Arena (capacity: 5,500)
- Conference: UAC
- Nickname: Governors
- Colors: Red and white

NCAA Division I tournament Sweet Sixteen
- 1973†

NCAA Division I tournament appearances
- 1973†, 1974, 1987, 1996, 2003, 2008, 2016

NCAA Division II tournament Elite Eight
- 1961
Other NCAA Division II tournament results
Sweet Sixteen	1960, 1961
Appearances	1958, 1960, 1961, 1963,

Conference tournament champions
- 1987, 1996, 2003, 2008, 2016

Conference regular-season champions
- 1973, 1974, 1977, 1997, 2003, 2004, 2007, 2008, 2026

Uniforms
Home	Away
- † vacated by NCAA

The Austin Peay Governors men's basketball team represents Austin Peay State University in Clarksville, Tennessee. The Governors play in the United Athletic Conference starting in 2022–23, following 61 seasons in the Ohio Valley Conference. Austin Peay has qualified for the NCAA Division I men's basketball tournament seven times, most recently in 2016, making the field of 68 by virtue of having won the 2016 Ohio Valley Conference men's basketball tournament. The Governors' head coach is Corey Gipson.

The 2022–23 season was not only Peay's first in the ASUN Conference, but also was its last at Winfield Dunn Center. After that season, the Governors moved to the new F&M Bank Arena in downtown Clarksville. The new arena was originally intended to open for the 2022–23 season, but was delayed to July 2023.

Historically, the "Governors" nickname applied only to Peay's men's teams; women's teams were known as "Lady Govs". However, since the mid-2010s, all Peay teams have used "Governors".

== Rivalries ==
The Governors' main rival has historically been Murray State University. The two schools are separated by about 65 miles (105 km) and consistently vied for Ohio Valley Conference championships. ESPN The Magazine featured the Austin Peay–Murray State rivalry in a February 2009 issue. However, the two schools are now in separate conferences, with Peay having joined the ASUN and Murray State the Missouri Valley Conference in July 2022.

== Year-by-year results ==
Year	Coach	Overall	Conference	Standing	Postseason
1942–43	Fred Brown	9–10			
1943–44	WWII	n/a			
1944–45	WWII	n/a			
1945–46	Bee Low	2–19			
1946–47	David Aaron	23–5			
1947–48	David Aaron	16–9			
1948–49	David Aaron	17–13			
1949–50	David Aaron	14–11			
1950–51	David Aaron	13–12			
1951–52	David Aaron	11–17			
1952–53	David Aaron	14–12			
1953–54	David Aaron	14–13			
1954–55	David Aaron	7–17			
1955–56	David Aaron	16–11			
1956–57	David Aaron	24–9			
1957–58	David Aaron	17–9			
1958–59	David Aaron	17–9			
1959–60	David Aaron	22–5			
1960–61	David Aaron	22–9	(9–1) VSAC		
1961–62	David Aaron	14–12	(8–2) VSAC		
1962–63	George Fisher	18–11	(9–1) VSAC		
1963–64	George Fisher	14–9	(7–7) OVC		
1964–65	George Fisher	4–17	(2–12) OVC		
1965–66	George Fisher	7–14	(3–11) OVC		
1966–67	George Fisher	14–9	(7–7) OVC		
1967–68	George Fisher	8–16	(2–12) OVC		
1968–69	George Fisher	10–14	(3–11) OVC		
1969–70	George Fisher	5–21	(2–12) OVC		
1970–71	George Fisher	10–14	(5–9) OVC		
1971–72	Lake Kelly	10–14	(5–9) OVC		
1972–73	Lake Kelly	21–5	(11–3) OVC		Lost Regional semifinal
1973–74	Lake Kelly	17–10	(10–4) OVC		Lost First round
1974–75	Lake Kelly	17–10	(10–4) OVC		
1975–76	Lake Kelly	20–7	(10–4) OVC		
1976–77	Lake Kelly	24–4	(13–1) OVC		
1977–78	Ed Thompson	15–12	(8–6) OVC		
1978–79	Ed Thompson	8–18	(3–9) OVC		
1979–80	Ron Bargatze	8–18	(2–10) OVC		
1980–81	Ron Bargatze	14–13	(7–7) OVC		
1981–82	Ron Bargatze	6–20	(4–12) OVC		
1982–83	Ron Bargatze	11–16	(4–10) OVC		
1983–84	Howard Jackson	11–16	(5–9) OVC		
1984–85	Howard Jackson	8–19	(4–10) OVC		
1985–86	Lake Kelly	14–14	(8–6) OVC		
1986–87	Lake Kelly	20–12	(8–6) OVC		Lost Second Round
1987–88	Lake Kelly	17–13	(10–4) OVC		
1988–89	Lake Kelly	18–12	(8–4) OVC		
1989–90	Lake Kelly	10–19	(2–10) OVC		
1990–91	Dave Loos	15–14	(6–6) OVC		
1991–92	Dave Loos	11–17	(6–8) OVC		
1992–93	Dave Loos	7–20	(4–12) OVC		
1993–94	Dave Loos	11–16	(10–6) OVC		
1994–95	Dave Loos	13–16	(8–8) OVC		
1995–96	Dave Loos	19–11	(10–6) OVC		Lost First round
1996–97	Dave Loos	17–14	(12–6) OVC		
1997–98	Dave Loos	17–11	(11–7) OVC		
1998–99	Dave Loos	11–16	(9–9) OVC		
1999–2000	Dave Loos	18–10	(11–7) OVC		
2000–01	Dave Loos	22–10	(10–6) OVC		
2001–02	Dave Loos	14–18	(8–8) OVC		
2002–03	Dave Loos	23–8	(13–3) OVC		Lost First round
2003–04	Dave Loos	22–10	6–0) OVC		
2004–05	Dave Loos	13–19	(9–7) OVC		
2005–06	Dave Loos	17–14	(11–9) OVC		
2006–07	Dave Loos	21–12	(16–4) OVC		
2007–08	Dave Loos	24–11	(16–4) OVC		Lost First round
2008–09	Dave Loos	19–14	(13–5) OVC		Lost CIT Quarterfinals
2009–10	Dave Loos	17–15	(11–7) OVC		
2010–11	Dave Loos	20–14	(13–5) OVC		
2011–12	Dave Loos	12–20	(8–8) OVC		
2012–13	Dave Loos	8–23	(4–12) OVC		
2013–14	Dave Loos	12–18	(6–10) OVC		
2014–15	Dave Loos	8–22	(3–13) OVC		
2015–16	Dave Loos	18–18	(7–9) OVC		Lost First round
2016–17	Dave Loos	11–19	(7–9) OVC		
2017–18	Matt Figger	19–15	(12–6) OVC		Lost CIT Quarterfinals
2018–19	Matt Figger	22–10	(13–5) OVC		
2019–20	Matt Figger	21–12	(14–4) OVC		
2020–21	Matt Figger	14–13	(10–10) OVC		
2021–22	Nate James	12–17	(8–10) OVC		
2022–23	Nate James	9–22	(3–15) ASUN		
2023–24	Corey Gipson	19–16	(10–6) ASUN		Lost CIT Quarterfinals
2024–25	Corey Gipson	14–18	(8–10) ASUN		
2025–26	Corey Gipson	22–9	(15–3) ASUN		

== Postseason ==
=== NCAA Division I tournament results ===
The Governors have appeared in the NCAA Division I tournament seven (officially, six) times. Their combined record is 2–8, 1–6 without their 1973 NCAA tournament appearance (1 win, 2 losses), which was vacated by the NCAA.

Year	Round	Opponent	Result
1973*	Regional Quarterfinals; Regional semifinals Mideast Regional third place	Jacksonville; Kentucky; Marquette	W 77–75; L 100–106 ^{OT} L 73–88
1974	Regional Quarterfinals	Notre Dame	L 66–108
1987	First round Second Round	Illinois; Providence	W 68–67; L 87–90 ^{OT}
1996	First round	Georgia Tech	L 79–90
2003	First round	Louisville	L 64–86
2008	First round	Texas	L 54–74
2016	First round	Kansas	L 79–105

=== NCAA Division II tournament results ===
The Governors have appeared in the NCAA Division II tournament four times. Their combined record is 3–6.

Year	Round	Opponent	Result
1958	Regional semifinals Regional 3rd-place game	Akron; Wabash	L 61–76; L 69–72
1960	Regional semifinals Regional Finals	Belmont Abbey; Kentucky Wesleyan	W 74–63; L 69–83
1961	Regional semifinals Regional Finals; Elite Eight	Chattanooga; Belmont Abbey; Mount St. Mary's	W 77–69; W 70–63; L 78–96
1963	Regional semifinals Regional 3rd-place game	Tennessee State; Bellarmine	L 94–119; L 86–96

=== NIT results ===
The Governors have appeared in the National Invitation Tournament (NIT) two times. Their combined record is 1–2.

Year	Round	Opponent	Result
2004	Opening Round; First round	Belmont; George Mason	W 66–60; L 100–106
2007	First round	Air Force	L 51–75

=== CBI results ===
The Governors have appeared in the College Basketball Invitational (CBI) one time. Their record is 0–1.

Year	Round	Opponent	Result
2011	First round	Boise State	L 80–83

=== CIT results ===
The Governors have appeared in the CollegeInsider.com Postseason Tournament (CIT) two times. Their combined record is 1–3.

Year	Round	Opponent	Result
2009	First round	Bradley	L 74–81
2018	First round Quarterfinals	Louisiana–Monroe; UIC	W 80–66; L 81–83
2024	Quarterfinals	Alabama A&M	L 71–81

=== NAIA results ===
The Governors have appeared in the NAIA tournament once, with a loss in its only game.

Year	Round	Opponent	Result
1957	First Round	(5) Portland (OR)	L 65-77

== Notable players ==
=== Retired numbers ===
Austin Peay Governors retired numbers
No.	Player	Pos.	Career	No. ret.	Ref.
10	Tom Morgan	F	1974–1978	1999	
13	Bubba Wells	F	1993–1997	1998	
21	Terry Taylor	F	2017–2021	2023	
30	Howie Wright	G	1967–1970	1992	
35	Fly Williams	G	1972–1974	2009	
44	Trenton Hassell	F	1997–2001	2002	

=== Retired jerseys ===
No.	Player	Pos.	Tenure	Jer. ret.	Ref.
45	L.M. Ellis (Note: Ellis was the first black basketball player to play at Austin Peay.)	F	1962–1965	2022	
420	Dave Loos (Note: Number retired for his 420 Victories as head coach.)	Head coach	1990–2017	2022	

=== Professional international players ===
- Eli Abaev (born 1998), American-Israeli basketball player for Hapoel Be'er Sheva in the Israeli Basketball Premier League
- Chris Horton (born 1994) – basketball player for Hapoel Tel Aviv of the Israeli Basketball Premier League
