= Morehead State Eagles men's basketball statistical leaders =

The Morehead State Eagles men's basketball statistical leaders are individual statistical leaders of the Morehead State Eagles men's basketball program in various categories, including points, assists, blocks, rebounds, and steals. Within those areas, the lists identify single-game, single-season, and career leaders. The Eagles represent the Morehead State University in the NCAA's Ohio Valley Conference.

Morehead State began competing in intercollegiate basketball in 1929. However, the school's record book does not generally list records from before the 1950s, as records from before this period are often incomplete and inconsistent. Since scoring was much lower in this era, and teams played much fewer games during a typical season, it is likely that few or no players from this era would appear on these lists anyway.

The NCAA did not officially record assists as a stat until the 1983–84 season, and blocks and steals until the 1985–86 season, but Morehead State's record books includes players in these stats before these seasons. These lists are updated through the end of the 2020–21 season.

== Scoring ==
Career
Rk	Player	Points	Seasons
1	Ricky Minard	2,381	2000–01 2001–02 2002–03 2003–04
2	Herbie Stamper	2,072	1975–76 1976–77 1977–78 1978–79
3	Kenneth Faried	2,009	2007–08 2008–09 2009–10 2010–11
4	Dan Swartz	1,925	1953–54 1954–55 1955–56
5	Sonny Allen	1,923	1946–47 1947–48 1948–49 1949–50
6	Steve Hamilton	1,829	1954–55 1955–56 1956–57 1957–58
7	Brett Roberts	1,788	1988–89 1989–90 1990–91 1991–92
8	Leonard Coulter	1,781	1971–72 1972–73 1973–74
9	Granville Williams	1,637	1958–59 1960–61 1961–62
10	Angelo Warner	1,592	2011–12 2012–13 2013–14 2014–15

Season
Rk	Player	Points	Season
1	Dan Swartz	828	1955–56
2	Brett Roberts	815	1991–92
3	Granville Williams	705	1960–61
4	Riley Minix	733	2023–24
5	Steve Hamilton	654	1956–57
6	Ricky Minard	653	2002–03
7	Leonard Coulter	651	1971–72
	Dan Swartz	651	1954–55
9	Ricky Minard	646	2001–02
10	Ricky Minard	631	2003–04

Single game
Rk	Player	Points	Season	Opponent
1	Brett Roberts	53	1991–92	MTSU

== Rebounds ==
Career
Rk	Player	Rebounds	Seasons
1	Steve Hamilton	1,675	1954–55 1955–56 1956–57 1957–58
2	Kenneth Faried	1,673	2007–08 2008–09 2009–10 2010–11
3	Norman Pokley	1,046	1960–61 1961–62 1962–63
4	Leonard Coulter	961	1971–72 1972–73 1973–74
5	Lamar Green	914	1966–67 1967–68 1968–69
6	Ted Hundley	901	1973–74 1974–75 1975–76 1976–77
7	Brett Roberts	897	1988–89 1989–90 1990–91 1991–92
8	Bob McCann	862	1984–85 1985–86 1986–87
9	Doug Bentz	808	1988–89 1989–90 1991–92 1992–93
10	Willie Jackson	793	1966–67 1967–68 1968–69

Season
Rk	Player	Rebounds	Season
1	Steve Hamilton	543	1956–57
2	Kenneth Faried	508	2010–11
3	Lamar Green	483	1968–69
4	Kenneth Faried	468	2008–09
5	Kenneth Faried	456	2009–10
6	Norman Pokley	408	1960–61
7	Steve Hamilton	403	1957–58
8	Dan Swartz	397	1955–56
9	Steve Hamilton	395	1955–56
10	Leonard Coulter	375	1971–72

Single game
Rk	Player	Rebounds	Season	Opponent
1	Steve Hamilton	38	1956–57	Florida State

== Assists ==
Career
Rk	Player	Assists	Seasons
1	Marquis Sykes	606	1999–00 2000–01 2001–02 2002–03
2	Ricky Minard	417	2000–01 2001–02 2002–03 2003–04
3	Howard Wallen	411	1971–72 1972–73 1973–74
4	Ta'lon Cooper	407	2019–20 2020–21 2021–22
5	Demonte Harper	400	2007–08 2008–09 2009–10 2010–11
6	Ted Docks	356	1995–96 1996–97 1997–98 1998–99
7	Drew Thelwell	339	2020–21 2021–22 2022–23 2023–24
8	Jeff Fultz	336	1980–81 1981–82 1982–83 1983–84
9	Nikola Stojakovic	329	2006–07 2007–08
10	A.J. Hicks	312	2017–18 2018–19

Season
Rk	Player	Assists	Season
1	Drew Thelwell	211	2023–24
2	Nikola Stojakovic	204	2007–08
3	Ta'lon Cooper	202	2021–22
4	A.J. Hicks	190	2018–19
5	Marquis Sykes	189	2001–02
6	Jeff Fultz	176	1983–84
7	Devon Atkinson	169	2012–13
	Howard Wallen	169	1971–72
9	Kareem Storey	162	2013–14
	Bobby Hiles	162	1969–70

Single game
Rk	Player	Assists	Season	Opponent
1	Drew Thelwell	19	2023–24	Alice Lloyd College
2	Jeff Fultz	16	1983–84	Middle Tenn.
	Kareem Storey	16	2013–14	South Dakota

== Steals ==
Career
Rk	Player	Steals	Seasons
1	Ricky Minard	245	2000–01 2001–02 2002–03 2003–04
2	Kenneth Faried	228	2007–08 2008–09 2009–10 2010–11
3	Angelo Warner	207	2011–12 2012–13 2013–14 2014–15
4	Brent Arrington	196	2013–14 2014–15 2015–16
5	Demonte Harper	166	2007–08 2008–09 2009–10 2010–11
6	Marquis Sykes	165	1999–00 2000–01 2001–02 2002–03
7	Ted Docks	158	1995–96 1996–97 1997–98 1998–99
8	Guy Minnifield	156	1981–82 1982–83 1983–84
9	Brett Roberts	150	1988–89 1989–90 1990–91 1991–92
10	Jeremy Webb	133	1996–97 1997–98 1998–99 1999–00

Season
Rk	Player	Steals	Season
1	Ricky Minard	73	2001–02
2	Guy Minnifield	69	1982–83
3	Kenneth Faried	68	2008–09
4	Angelo Warner	67	2013–14
	Kenneth Faried	67	2010–11
6	Brent Arrington	66	2013–14
7	Brent Arrington	65	2015–16
	Brent Arrington	65	2014–15
9	Ricky Minard	63	2002–03
10	Justin Thomas	60	2019–20
	Ricky Minard	60	2003–04

== Blocks ==
Career
Rk	Player	Blocks	Seasons
1	Kenneth Faried	241	2007–08 2008–09 2009–10 2010–11
2	Bob McCann	224	1984–85 1985–86 1986–87
3	Johni Broome	187	2020–21 2021–22
4	James Baker	130	2017–18 2018–19 2019–20 2020–21
5	George Williams	115	1973–74 1974–75
6	Ron Nicholson	104	1971–72 1972–73
7	Marlon Witherspoon	98	1994–95 1995–96
8	Luke Lloyd	83	1995–96 1996–97 1997–98
9	Rod Mitchell	77	1990–91
10	Ricky Minard	71	2000–01 2001–02 2002–03 2003–04

Season
Rk	Player	Blocks	Season
1	Johni Broome	131	2021–22
2	George Williams	115	1973–74
3	Ron Nicholson	104	1971–72
4	Bob McCann	83	1986–87
5	Kenneth Faried	82	2010–11
6	Rod Mitchell	77	1990–91
7	Bob McCann	74	1984–85
8	Kenneth Faried	68	2008–09
	Alex Gross	68	2022–23
10	Kenneth Faried	67	2009–10
	Bob McCann	67	1985–86

Single game
Rk	Player	Blocks	Season	Opponent
1	Ron Nicholson	12	1971–72	Toldeo
	Johni Broome	12	2021–22	UT Martin
