= 2010–11 Austin Peay Governors basketball team =

American college basketball season

2010–11 Austin Peay Governors basketball

CBI, First Round
- Conference: Ohio Valley Conference
- Record: 20–14 (13–5 OVC)
- Head coach: Dave Loos (21st season)
- Assistant coaches: Bret Campbell (8th season); Scott Combs (12th season); Bubba Wells (6th season)
- Home arena: Winfield Dunn Center

2010–11 Ohio Valley Conference men's basketball standings
	Conf.				Overall
Team	W		L	PCT	W		L	PCT
Murray State	14	–	4	.778	23	–	9	.719
Morehead State †	13	–	5	.722	25	–	9	.735
Austin Peay	13	–	5	.722	20	–	14	.588
Tennessee Tech	12	–	6	.667	20	–	13	.606
Tennessee State	10	–	8	.556	14	–	16	.467
Eastern Kentucky	9	–	9	.500	15	–	16	.484
UT Martin	6	–	12	.333	12	–	21	.364
Southeast Missouri State	6	–	12	.333	10	–	22	.313
Eastern Illinois	4	–	14	.222	9	–	20	.310
Jacksonville State	3	–	15	.167	5	–	25	.167
SIU Edwardsville*	0	–	0	–	8	–	21	.276
† 2011 OVC tournament winner As of March 17, 2011 * Ineligible (in transition) Rankings from AP Poll

The 2010–11 Austin Peay Governors basketball team represented Austin Peay State University in the 2010–11 NCAA Division I men's basketball season. The Governors, led by head coach Dave Loos, played their home games at the Winfield Dunn Center in Lawrenceville, New Jersey, as members of the Ohio Valley Conference. The Governors finished in a tie for 2nd in the OVC during the regular season, earning the 3rd seed in the Ohio Valley tournament. Austin Peay advanced to the semifinals of the OVC tournament, where they were eliminated by eventual tournament champions Morehead State.

Austin Peay failed to qualify for the NCAA tournament, but were invited to the 2011 College Basketball Invitational. The Governors were eliminated in the first round of the CBI, losing to Boise State, 83–80.

== Roster ==
2010–11 Austin Peay Governors men's basketball team
Players
Coaches

Pos.	#	Name	Height	Weight	Year	Hometown
G	3	Caleb Brown	6 ft 0 in (1.83 m)	175 lb (79 kg)	Sr	Memphis, Tennessee
F	4	Marcel Williams	6 ft 6 in (1.98 m)	230 lb (104 kg)	RS Jr	Ocoee, Florida
G	5	Tyrone Caldwell	6 ft 0 in (1.83 m)	180 lb (82 kg)	Jr	Clarksville, Tennessee
F	10	Will Triggs	6 ft 6 in (1.98 m)	220 lb (100 kg)	Fr	Edwardsville, Illinois
G	11	Thomas Greer	6 ft 5 in (1.96 m)	170 lb (77 kg)	Fr	Atwood, Tennessee
G	12	TyShwan Edmondson	6 ft 4 in (1.93 m)	180 lb (82 kg)	Jr	Hopkinsville, Kentucky
G	14	Alton Williams	6 ft 3 in (1.91 m)	190 lb (86 kg)	Fr	Collierville, Tennessee
F	20	Melvin Baker	6 ft 7 in (2.01 m)	190 lb (86 kg)	Jr	Amarillo, Texas
F/C	21	John Fraley	6 ft 9 in (2.06 m)	220 lb (100 kg)	RS Jr	Clarksville, Tennessee
G/F	23	Josh Terry	6 ft 4 in (1.93 m)	180 lb (82 kg)	Jr	Henderson, Kentucky
F	24	Joe Harms	6 ft 9 in (2.06 m)	200 lb (91 kg)	Fr	Belleville, Illinois
G/F	25	Anthony Campbell	6 ft 7 in (2.01 m)	195 lb (88 kg)	Jr	Edwardsville, Illinois
G	32	Justin Blake	6 ft 3 in (1.91 m)	185 lb (84 kg)	RS So	Bolivar, Tennessee
C	33	Matt Hasse	6 ft 10 in (2.08 m)	225 lb (102 kg)	Fr	Naperville, Illinois

Head coach

- Dave Loos (Memphis)

Assistant coach(es)

- Bret Campbell (Valdosta State)
- Scott Combs (Austin Peay)
- Bubba Wells (Austin Peay)

Legend

- (C) Team captain
- (S) Suspended
- (I) Ineligible
- (W) Walk-on
- Injured
- Current redshirt

Roster
Last update: January 23, 2023

== Schedule and results ==
Date time, TV	Rank^{#}	Opponent^{#}	Result	Record	Site (attendance) city, state
Exhibition
November 4, 2010*; 7:00 pm		Central Missouri	W 69–64	—	Dunn Center; Clarksville, TN
November 8, 2010*; 7:30 pm		Westminster (MO)	W 89–42	—	Dunn Center; Clarksville, TN
Regular season
November 12, 2010*; 7:30 pm		at Saint Louis	W 64–62	1–0	Chaifetz Arena (7,511); St. Louis, MO
November 15, 2010*; 6:00 pm		Chattanooga	W 70–67	2–0	McKenzie Arena (2,776); Chattanooga, TN
November 18, 2010*; 7:15 pm		at Lipscomb	L 101–104 ^{OT}	2–1	Allen Arena (2,621); Nashville, TN
November 21, 2010*; 2:05 pm		at Southern Illinois; Chicago Invitational Challenge	L 65–72	2–2	SIU Arena (4,072); Carbondale, IL
November 23, 2010*; 6:00 pm, ESPN3		at No. 10 Purdue; Chicago Invitational Challenge	L 65–87	2–3	Mackey Arena (14,123); West Lafayette, IN
November 26, 2010*; 12:00 pm		vs. Charleston Southern; Chicago Invitational Challenge	W 70–64	3–3	Sears Centre Arena (3,392); Hoffman Estates, IL
November 27, 2010*; 1:30 pm		vs. Oakland; Chicago Invitational Challenge	L 70–78	3–4	Sears Centre Arena; Hoffman Estates, IL
December 2, 2010; 7:30 pm		at Southeast Missouri State	W 78–60	4–4 (1–0)	Show Me Center (1,758); Cape Girardeau, MO
December 4, 2010; 6:00 pm		at Eastern Illinois	W 77–73 ^{OT}	5–4 (2–0)	Lantz Arena (1,128); Charleston, IL
December 7, 2010*; 7:30 pm		Lipscomb	L 70–73	5–5	Dunn Center (2,125); Clarksville, TN
December 11, 2010*; 7:30 pm		Fontbonne	W 112–52	6–5	Dunn Center (1,985); Clarksville, TN
December 16, 2010*; 7:00 pm, CSS		at No. 18 Memphis	L 68–70 ^{OT}	6–6	FedExForum (16,347); Memphis, TN
December 18, 2010; 7:00 pm		Eastern Kentucky	W 78–51	7–6 (3–0)	Dunn Center (2,078); Clarksville, TN
December 21, 2010; 7:30 pm		Morehead State	W 86–85 ^{OT}	8–6 (4–0)	Dunn Center (2,686); Clarksville, TN
December 28, 2010*; 7:00 pm		Brescia	W 101–46	9–6	Dunn Center (2,111); Clarksville, TN
January 3, 2011*; 7:00 pm		Chattanooga	W 89–57	10–6	Dunn Center (2,795); Clarksville, TN
January 8, 2011; 11:00 am, ESPNU		at Murray State	W 66–64	11–6 (5–0)	CFSB Center (4,872); Murray, KY
January 10, 2011; 6:00 pm		at UT Martin	W 71–61	12–6 (6–0)	Skyhawk Arena (1,027); Martin, TN
January 15, 2011; 3:00 pm, ESPNU		at Tennessee State	L 74–76 ^{OT}	12–7 (6–1)	Gentry Complex (5,817); Nashville, TN
January 20, 2011; 6:00 pm, ESPNU		Tennessee Tech	L 68–71	12–8 (6–2)	Dunn Center (2,301); Clarksville, TN
January 22, 2011; 7:30 pm		Jacksonville State	W 80–66	13–8 (7–2)	Dunn Center (3,186); Clarksville, TN
January 27, 2011; 6:30 pm		at Eastern Kentucky	W 61–52	14–8 (8–2)	McBrayer Arena (4,100); Richmond, KY
January 29, 2011; 6:00 pm		at Morehead State	L 56–69	14–9 (8–3)	Ellis Johnson Arena (4,909); Morehead, KY
February 3, 2011; 7:30 pm		UT Martin	W 82–53	15–9 (9–3)	Dunn Center (2,874); Clarksville, TN
February 5, 2011; 7:30 pm		at Murray State	L 58–67	15–10 (9–4)	Dunn Center (4,843); Clarksville, TN
February 7, 2011; 7:00 pm		at Tennessee Tech	L 64–70	15–11 (9–5)	Eblen Center (1,097); Cookeville, TN
February 12, 2011; 7:30 pm		Tennessee State	W 79–64	16–11 (10–5)	Dunn Center (4,124); Clarksville, TN
February 15, 2011; 7:00 pm		at Jacksonville State	W 73–70	17–11 (11–5)	Pete Mathews Coliseum (1,465); Jacksonville, AL
February 19, 2011*; 12:00 pm, ESPNU		at Fairfield; ESPN BracketBusters	L 69–76	17–12	Webster Bank Arena at Harbor Yard (3,942); Bridgeport, CT
February 24, 2011; 7:30 pm		Eastern Illinois	W 65–56	18–12 (12–5)	Dunn Center (2,786); Clarksville, TN
February 26, 2011; 7:30 pm		Southeast Missouri State	W 75–52	19–12 (13–5)	Dunn Center (3,553); Clarksville, TN
Ohio Valley tournament
March 3, 2011; 9:00 pm	(3)	vs. (7) Southeast Missouri State; OVC Quarterfinals	W 76–60	20–12	Nashville Municipal Auditorium (1,459); Nashville, TN
March 4, 2011; 9:00 pm	(3)	vs. (2) Morehead State; OVC Semifinals	L 49–68	20–13	Nashville Municipal Auditorium (3,592); Nashville, TN
CBI
March 15, 2011; 8:00 pm		at Boise State; CBI First Round	L 80–83	20–14	Taco Bell Arena (2,684); Boise, ID
*Non-conference game. ^{#}Rankings from AP Poll. (#) Tournament seedings in parentheses. All times are in Central Time.
