= 2010–11 Tennessee Tech Golden Eagles men's basketball team =

American college basketball season

2010–11 Tennessee Tech Golden Eagles men's basketball

CIT, First round
- Conference: Ohio Valley Conference
- Record: 20–13 (12–6 OVC)
- Head coach: Mike Sutton (9th season)
- Associate head coach: Steve Payne (9th season)
- Assistant coaches: Russ Willemsen (6th season); DeAntoine Beasley (1st season)
- Home arena: Eblen Center

2010–11 Ohio Valley Conference men's basketball standings
	Conf.				Overall
Team	W		L	PCT	W		L	PCT
Murray State	14	–	4	.778	23	–	9	.719
Morehead State †	13	–	5	.722	25	–	9	.735
Austin Peay	13	–	5	.722	20	–	14	.588
Tennessee Tech	12	–	6	.667	20	–	13	.606
Tennessee State	10	–	8	.556	14	–	16	.467
Eastern Kentucky	9	–	9	.500	15	–	16	.484
UT Martin	6	–	12	.333	12	–	21	.364
Southeast Missouri State	6	–	12	.333	10	–	22	.313
Eastern Illinois	4	–	14	.222	9	–	20	.310
Jacksonville State	3	–	15	.167	5	–	25	.167
SIU Edwardsville*	0	–	0	–	8	–	21	.276
† 2011 OVC tournament winner As of March 17, 2011 * Ineligible (in transition) Rankings from AP Poll

The 2010–11 Tennessee Tech Golden Eagles men's basketball team represented Tennessee Tech University in the 2010–11 NCAA Division I men's basketball season. The Golden Eagles, led by head coach Mike Sutton, played their home games at the Eblen Center in Cookeville, Tennessee, as members of the Ohio Valley Conference. The Golden Eagles finished 4th in the OVC during the regular season, and advanced to the championship game of the OVC tournament after upsetting top-seeded Murray State. Tennessee Tech fell in the championship game to Morehead State, 80-73.

Tennessee Tech failed to qualify for the NCAA tournament, but were invited to the 2011 CIT. The Golden Eagles were eliminated in the first round of the CIT by Western Michigan, 74–66.

This was head coach Mike Sutton's last season at the helm with the Golden Eagles; shortly after the season, he retired due to his ongoing battle with Guillain–Barré syndrome.

== Roster ==
2010–11 Tennessee Tech Golden Eagles men's basketball team
Players
Coaches

Pos.	#	Name	Height	Weight	Year	Hometown
G	2	Zac Swansey	6 ft 1 in (1.85 m)	180 lb (82 kg)	Jr	Dunwoody, Georgia
G	3	Charles Newton	6 ft 3 in (1.91 m)	175 lb (79 kg)	Sr	Lexington, Kentucky
C	4	Liam McMorrow	7 ft 0 in (2.13 m)	265 lb (120 kg)	RS Jr	Toronto, Ontario, Canada
G	5	Javon McKay	6 ft 5 in (1.96 m)	195 lb (88 kg)	Fr	Atlanta, Georgia
F	11	Terrell Barnes	6 ft 8 in (2.03 m)	225 lb (102 kg)	So	Riverdale, Georgia
G	12	Mitchell Hill	6 ft 1 in (1.85 m)	170 lb (77 kg)	Fr	Cookeville, Tennessee
G	15	Riley Hunley	6 ft 3 in (1.91 m)	185 lb (84 kg)	Jr	Knoxville, Tennessee
F	21	Matt Marseille	6 ft 6 in (1.98 m)	205 lb (93 kg)	So	Brooklyn, New York
F	23	Byron Pickens	6 ft 7 in (2.01 m)	195 lb (88 kg)	Sr	Chicago, Illinois
G	24	Chase Dunn	5 ft 10 in (1.78 m)	175 lb (79 kg)	RS Fr	Livingston, Tennessee
F	25	Jud Dillard	6 ft 4 in (1.93 m)	180 lb (82 kg)	So	Riverdale, Georgia
F	32	Bassey Inameti	6 ft 8 in (2.03 m)	215 lb (98 kg)	Jr	Suwanee, Georgia
F	33	Dennis Ogbe	6 ft 7 in (2.01 m)	200 lb (91 kg)	Fr	Munich, Germany
F	34	Alfred Jones	6 ft 7 in (2.01 m)	205 lb (93 kg)	Sr	Springfield, Illinois
G	42	Zach Bailey	6 ft 1 in (1.85 m)	175 lb (79 kg)	Jr	Fort Lauderdale, Florida
F	55	Kevin Murphy	6 ft 6 in (1.98 m)	185 lb (84 kg)	Jr	Fairburn, Georgia

Head coach

- Mike Sutton (East Carolina)

Assistant coach(es)

- Steve Payne (Union (NY))
- Russ Willemsen (Lee)
- DeAntoine Beasley (Tennessee Tech)

Legend

- (C) Team captain
- (S) Suspended
- (I) Ineligible
- (W) Walk-on
- Injured
- Current redshirt

Roster
Last update: January 20, 2023

== Schedule and results ==
Date time, TV	Rank^{#}	Opponent^{#}	Result	Record	Site (attendance) city, state
Exhibition
November 4, 2010*; 7:30 pm		Carson–Newman	W 96–61	—	Eblen Center; Cookeville, TN
Regular season
November 12, 2010*; 6:00 pm		at NC State	L 69–82	0–1	RBC Center (15,450); Raleigh, NC
November 20, 2010*; 3:00 pm		at East Tennessee State	L 60–73	0–2	ETSU/MSHA Athletic Center (4,105); Johnson City, TN
November 23, 2010*; 7:00 pm		Appalachian State	Cancelled; Appalachian State failed to provide officials		Eblen Center; Cookeville, TN
November 28, 2010*; 12:00 pm		at No. 2 Michigan State	L 55–73	0–3	Breslin Student Events Center (14,797); East Lansing, MI
December 1, 2010*; 6:00 pm		SIU Edwardsville	W 78–65	1–3	Eblen Center (1,482); Cookeville, TN
December 4, 2010; 7:45 pm		at Jacksonville State	W 64–62	2–3 (1–0)	Pete Mathews Coliseum (1,417); Jacksonville, AL
December 8, 2010*; 7:00 pm		High Point	L 69–80	2–4	Eblen Center (801); Cookeville, TN
December 11, 2010*; 7:00 pm		Lipscomb	L 94–98	2–5	Eblen Center (1,076); Cookeville, TN
December 16, 2010*; 7:00 pm		vs. Hiwassee	W 113–42	3–5	Livingston Academy (515); Livingston, TN
December 19, 2010; 4:00 pm		Eastern Illinois	W 65–64	4–5 (2–0)	Eblen Center (1,110); Cookeville, TN
December 21, 2010; 7:30 pm		Southeast Missouri State	L 75–77	4–6 (2–1)	Eblen Center (1,068); Cookeville, TN
December 30, 2010*; 7:00 pm		Crowley's Ridge	W 106–44	5–6	Eblen Center; Cookeville, TN
January 2, 2011*; 4:00 pm		Bluefield	W 74–56	6–6	Eblen Center (1,342); Cookeville, TN
January 6, 2011; 6:30 pm		at Morehead State	L 64–76	6–7 (2–2)	Ellis Johnson Arena (2,206); Morehead, KY
January 8, 2011; 6:00 pm		at Eastern Kentucky	W 78–66	7–7 (3–2)	McBrayer Arena (2,200); Richmond, KY
January 13, 2011; 7:30 pm		UT Martin	W 109–105 ^{3OT}	8–7 (4–2)	Eblen Center; Cookeville, TN
January 15, 2011; 7:30 pm		Murray State	L 85–92	8–8 (4–3)	Eblen Center (2,520); Cookeville, TN
January 20, 2011; 7:30 pm		at Austin Peay	W 71–68	9–8 (5–3)	Dunn Center (2,301); Clarksville, TN
January 22, 2011; 7:30 pm		at Tennessee State	L 65–71	9–9 (5–4)	Gentry Complex (3,861); Nashville, TN
January 27, 2011; 7:30 pm		at Eastern Illinois	W 77–74	10–9 (6–4)	Lantz Arena (1,607); Charleston, IL
January 29, 2011; 6:00 pm		at Southeast Missouri State	W 93–86	11–9 (7–4)	Show Me Center (5,966); Cape Girardeau, MO
February 3, 2011; 7:30 pm		Eastern Kentucky	W 63–54	12–9 (8–4)	Eblen Center (2,845); Cookeville, TN
February 5, 2011; 7:30 pm		Morehead State	L 60–76	12–10 (8–5)	Eblen Center (2,753); Cookeville, TN
February 7, 2011; 7:00 pm		Austin Peay	W 70–64	13–10 (9–5)	Eblen Center (1,097); Cookeville, TN
February 10, 2011; 7:30 pm		at Murray State	L 44–55	13–11 (9–6)	CFSB Center (3,167); Murray, KY
February 12, 2011; 6:00 pm		at UT Martin	W 85–71	14–11 (10–6)	Skyhawk Arena (2,522); Martin, TN
February 14, 2011; 7:00 pm		Tennessee State	W 61–59	15–11 (11–6)	Eblen Center (1,319); Cookeville, TN
February 19, 2011*; 7:30 pm		Gardner–Webb; ESPN BracketBusters	W 60–58	16–11	Eblen Center (3,635); Cookeville, TN
February 22, 2011*; 7:30 pm		at SIU Edwardsville	W 92–69	17–11	Vadalabene Center (1,792); Edwardsville, IL
February 26, 2011; 7:30 pm		at Jacksonville State	W 77–75	18–11 (12–6)	Eblen Center (2,516); Cookeville, TN
Ohio Valley tournament
March 3, 2011; 6:00 pm	(4)	vs. (8) UT Martin; OVC Quarterfinals	W 83–59	19–11	Nashville Municipal Auditorium; Nashville, TN
March 4, 2011; 7:00 pm	(4)	vs. (1) Murray State; OVC Semifinals	W 64–59	20–11	Nashville Municipal Auditorium; Nashville, TN
March 5, 2011; 7:00 pm, ESPN2	(4)	vs. (2) Morehead State; OVC Championship	L 73–80	20–12	Nashville Municipal Auditorium (2,769); Nashville, TN
CollegeInsider.com tournament
March 16, 2011; 6:00 pm		at Western Michigan; CIT First Round	L 66–74	20–13	University Arena (1,628); Kalamazoo, MI
*Non-conference game. ^{#}Rankings from AP Poll. (#) Tournament seedings in parentheses. All times are in Central Time.
