= Donnie Tyndall =

American basketball coach (born 1970)

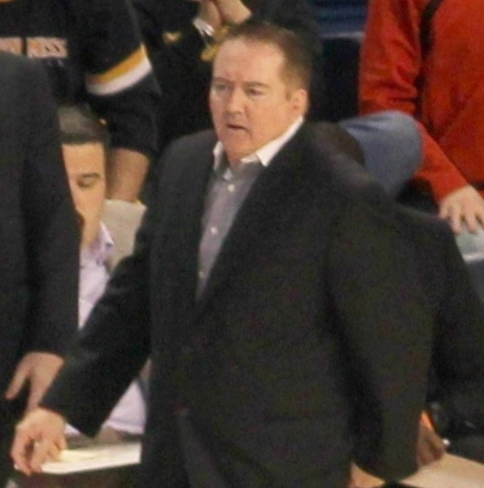
- Tyndall in 2013 as Southern Miss coach

Chipola College
- Position: Head coach
- League: Panhandle Conference

Personal information
- Born: June 14, 1970 (age 56) Ravenna, Michigan, U.S.

Career information
- High school: Academy of the Holy Angels
- College: Iowa Central CC (1989–1990); Morehead State (1990–1993)
- Coaching career: 1994–present

Career history

Coaching
- 1994–1996: Iowa Central CC (assistant)
- 1996–1997: St. Catharine JC
- 1997–2001: LSU (assistant)
- 2001–2002: Idaho (associate HC)
- 2002–2006: Middle Tennessee (associate HC)
- 2006–2012: Morehead State
- 2012–2014: Southern Miss
- 2014–2015: Tennessee
- 2016–2018: Raptors 905 (assistant)
- 2018–2019: Grand Rapids Drive (assistant)
- 2019–2020: Grand Rapids Drive
- 2020–present: Chipola College

Career highlights
- NBA D-League champion (2017); 2× OVC tournament (2009, 2011); Conference USA regular season (2014)

Donald Joseph Tyndall (born June 14, 1970) is an American basketball coach currently working as the head coach for Chipola College of the NJCAA. Tyndall played college basketball at Iowa Central Community College and Morehead State and has been a basketball coach since 1994. His teams are known for pressing and playing an unconventional match-up zone, a highly successful variation of the defensive system employed by coach Rick Pitino at Louisville.

Tyndall began his coaching career at the junior college level, first as an assistant at Iowa Central Community College from 1994 to 1996. He had his first head coaching position in the 1996–97 season at St. Catharine College, where he had 30 wins. Tyndall moved up to the NCAA level as an assistant coach at LSU, Idaho, and Middle Tennessee from 1997 to 2006.

Returning to his alma mater, Tyndall was head coach at Morehead State from 2006 to 2012. Tyndall turned around a losing program into a top performer in the Ohio Valley Conference. In six seasons, he had 114 wins and two NCAA Tournament appearances, including an upset of #4 seed Louisville in the 2011 tournament. From 2012 to 2014, Tyndall was head coach at Southern Miss; he was head coach at Tennessee in the 2014–15 season. However, when violations of academic eligibility and financial aid rules at Southern Miss came to light in 2015, Tennessee fired Tyndall after one season. In 2016, the NCAA found Tyndall liable for the violations, vacating all of his wins at Southern Miss and banning him from the collegiate coaching ranks for 10 years.

== Coaching career ==
=== As an assistant / Junior College head coach ===
After graduating from Morehead State University in 1993, Tyndall began coaching at the junior college level. From 1994 to 1996, he was assistant coach at Iowa Central Community College. Tyndall had his first head coaching position in the 1996–97 season at St. Catharine College in Springfield, Kentucky. Tyndall led St. Catharine to a 30–5 record and the school's first-ever NJCAA tournament appearance. In 1997, Tyndall earned NJCAA Region 7 National Coach of the Year and Kentucky Junior College Coach of the Year honors.

After his season at St. Catharine, Tyndall got his first NCAA Division I coaching position as an assistant at LSU under John Brady, a position he would hold from 1997 to 2001. Tyndall helped LSU finish first in the SEC West Division in the 1999–00 season and make the Sweet 16 round of the 2000 NCAA tournament. This LSU team also featured Stromile Swift, the #2 pick in the 2000 NBA draft.

In the 2001–02 season, Tyndall served as associate head coach at Idaho under Leonard Perry.

From 2002 to 2006, Tyndall was associate head coach at Middle Tennessee under Kermit Davis. Middle Tennessee had winning seasons all four of those seasons.

=== Morehead State (2006–2012) ===
In his first Division I head coaching job, Tyndall served as head coach at his alma mater Morehead State from 2006 to 2012. Morehead State under Tyndall was Conference Coach of the Year in 2007-08 won the Ohio Valley Conference tournaments of 2009 and 2011 and earned automatic NCAA Tournament bids those years. Morehead State also made the 2010 College Basketball Invitational.

In August 2010, the NCAA placed Morehead State on two years' probation for violations by boosters. As a #13 seed, Morehead State upset #4 seed Louisville 62–61 in the first round of the 2011 NCAA tournament.

=== Southern Miss (2012–2014) ===
Tyndall was the head coach at the Southern Miss from 2012 to 2014. Southern Miss made the National Invitation Tournament in 2013 and 2014 and finished first in Conference USA standings for the 2013–14 season. Tyndall went 56–17 as head coach at Southern Miss, but in 2016, the NCAA vacated all 56 wins due to academic fraud.

=== Tennessee (2014–2015) ===
On April 22, 2014, Tyndall was hired as head basketball coach at the University of Tennessee, after spending the previous two seasons as the head basketball coach at Southern Miss. Tennessee finished 16–16 in taking over a gutted roster from Cuonzo Martin’s departure to Cal in what would be Tyndall's only season as head coach.

On March 27, 2015, Tennessee fired Tyndall after the NCAA notified Tennessee officials of possible major violations at Southern Miss relating to academic ineligibility and improper financial aid. According to a copy of Tyndall's termination letter, Tyndall had lied to Tennessee officials about the extent of the violations on several occasions. Athletics director Dave Hart said that Tyndall would likely have faced significant discipline from the NCAA for his role in the violations at Southern Miss. He added that he would have never hired Tyndall had the true extent of the violations at Southern Miss been known.

Tyndall was the second Tennessee coach in five years to be ensnared in a major NCAA infractions scandal, following Bruce Pearl. According to ESPN, Hart and other officials were still reeling from Pearl having to sit out eight SEC games during the 2010-11 season for violations related to his own scandal. They were unwilling to face the prospect of Tyndall facing an equally lengthy suspension.

=== NCAA sanctions ===
On April 8, 2016, the NCAA imposed a 10-year show-cause penalty on Tyndall, to run until April 7, 2026–at the time, tied for the longest ever imposed on a head coach. This means that any NCAA member school that wants to hire him during this period will have to "show cause" for why it shouldn't be sanctioned for doing so, and could incur penalties if he commits another violation during this time. It also stipulates that any penalties imposed on Tyndall will follow him to any NCAA member school if he is ever hired again.

Shockingly, the NCAA deemed Tyndall's violations to be as egregious as those committed by Dave Bliss at Baylor 16 years earlier. At the time, Bliss was the only other head coach to be slapped with a show-cause lasting 10 or more years. The NCAA added two unprecedented stipulations to Tyndall's show-cause. It required any NCAA member school who hires Tyndall during his show-cause to suspend him from coaching duties–effectively banning him from coaching at any NCAA member school until the end of the 2025–26 season. This was very unusual since Tyndall would have likely found it difficult to return to the collegiate ranks in any event while his show-cause was in effect. A show-cause usually has the effect of blackballing a coach from the collegiate ranks at least for the duration of the show-cause; most schools will not even consider hiring a coach with such a severe penalty on his record. The NCAA also decreed that if Tyndall ever coaches again at an NCAA member school after the show-cause runs out, he must sit out the first few games of the season of his return. However, it is very difficult for a head coach to return to the collegiate ranks even after a show-cause expires; only four have ever done so.

USA Today called Tyndall's show-cause the most severe and uncalled for penalty that the NCAA has ever meted out to a head coach.

=== As a professional coach ===
On November 4, 2016, Tyndall was hired by the Toronto Raptors to be the lead assistant coach on their development team, Raptors 905. under Jerry Stackhouse. In 2016–17 they led the Raptors 905 to the G League Championship that season. The next year, 2017–18, they lost in the Finals. Toronto Raptors head coach Dwane Casey was fired in May 2018 and was then hired as the head coach of the Detroit Pistons; Tyndall then took an assistant coaching role with Grand Rapids Drive, the development team for the Pistons. After one season, he was promoted to head coach of the Drive for the 2019–20 season.During the Covid-shortened season, he led the Drive to a 25–18 record and had the league’s top defense in points allowed and defensive rating.

=== Return to College ===
On June 17, 2020, Tyndall was hired by Chipola College as the head men’s basketball coach. Tyndall replaced Brendan Foley who became an assistant at Buffalo. Since being at Chipola, he has amassed an overall record of 161-37 and has won the Conference and Coach of the Year Award all 6 seasons he has coached there.

== Head coaching record ==
=== Junior college ===
Record table
Season	Team	Overall	Conference	Standing	Postseason
St. Catharine Patriots (Mid-South Conference) (1996–1997)
1996–97	St. Catharine College	30–5			National Junior College Tournament
St. Catharine College:		30–5 (.857)			
Total:		30–5 (.857)			

=== College ===
Record table
Season	Team	Overall	Conference	Standing	Postseason
Morehead State Eagles (Ohio Valley Conference) (2006–2012)
2006–07	Morehead State	12–18	8–12	T–7th	
2007–08	Morehead State	15–15	12–8	3rd	
2008–09	Morehead State	20–16	12–6	4th	NCAA Division I Round of 64
2009–10	Morehead State	24–11	15–3	2nd	CBI Quarterfinals
2010–11	Morehead State	25–10	13–5	2nd	NCAA Division I Round of 32
2011–12	Morehead State	18–14	10–6	3rd	
Morehead State:		114–84 (.576)	70–40 (.636)		
Southern Miss Golden Eagles (Conference USA) (2012–2014)
2012–13	Southern Miss	27-10*	12-4*	* 2nd	NIT Quarterfinals^{*}
2013–14	Southern Miss	29-7*	13-3*	*1st	NIT Quarterfinals^{*}
Southern Mississippi:		56-17 (.767)	25-7 (.781)		
Tennessee Volunteers (Southeastern Conference) (2014–2015)
2014–15	Tennessee	16–16	7–11	10th	
Tennessee:		16–16 (.500)	7–11 (.389)		
Total:		186–117 (.614)			
National champion Postseason invitational champion Conference regular season champion Conference regular season and conference tournament champion Division regular season champion Division regular season and conference tournament champion Conference tournament champion

* Southern Miss's original records were 27–10 (12–4, 2nd in C-USA) in 2012–13 and 29–7 (13–3, 1st in C-USA) in 2013–14. However, all 56 wins from those seasons were vacated by the NCAA due to participation of academically ineligible players.
