= 2009 Ohio Valley Conference men's basketball tournament =

- 2009 Tournament logo
- Classification: Division I
- Season: 2008–09
- Teams: 8
- First round site: campus sites
- Semifinals site: Sommet Center; Nashville, Tennessee
- Finals site: Sommet Center; Nashville, Tennessee
- Champions: Morehead State (3rd title)
- Winning coach: Donnie Tyndall (1st title)
- MVP: Kenneth Faried (Morehead State)
- Television: ESPNU, ESPN2

2008–09 Ohio Valley Conference men's basketball standings
	Conf.				Overall
Team	W		L	PCT	W		L	PCT
Tennessee–Martin	14	–	4	.778	22	–	10	.688
Murray State	13	–	5	.722	19	–	12	.613
Austin Peay	13	–	5	.722	19	–	14	.576
Morehead State †	12	–	6	.667	20	–	16	.556
Eastern Kentucky	10	–	8	.556	18	–	13	.581
Tennessee State	9	–	9	.500	12	–	18	.400
Eastern Illinois	8	–	10	.444	12	–	18	.400
Tennessee Tech	6	–	12	.333	12	–	18	.400
Jacksonville State	5	–	13	.278	11	–	17	.393
Southeast Missouri State	0	–	18	.000	3	–	27	.100
† Ohio Valley Conference tournament winner As of April 1, 2009; Rankings from AP Poll

The 2009 Ohio Valley Conference men's basketball tournament took place March 3, 6, and 7, 2009. The first round was hosted by the better seed in each game, and the semifinals and finals took place at Sommet Center in Nashville, Tennessee. The tournament was won by the Morehead State Eagles.

== Format ==
The top eight eligible men's basketball teams in the Ohio Valley Conference receive a berth in the conference tournament. After the 20 game conference season, teams are seeded by conference record.

== Bracket ==
Quarterfinals; March 3
1	Tennessee-Martin	93
8	Tennessee Tech	75
5	Eastern Kentucky	72
4	Morehead State	91
3	Murray State	88
6	Tennessee State	74
7	Eastern Illinois	54
2	Austin Peay	57

Semifinals; March 6
1	Tennessee-Martin	55
4	Morehead State	62
3	Murray State	50
2	Austin Peay	67

Finals; March 7
4	Morehead State	67^{2OT}
2	Austin Peay	65
