= 2010–11 Morehead State Eagles men's basketball team =

American college basketball season

2010–11 Morehead State Eagles men's basketball

OVC tournament champions

NCAA Tournament, Round of 32
- Conference: Ohio Valley Conference
- Record: 25–10 (13–5 OVC)
- Head coach: Donnie Tyndall
- Assistant coaches: Wade O'Connor; Joseph Price; Adam Howard
- Home arena: Ellis Johnson Arena

2010–11 Ohio Valley Conference men's basketball standings
	Conf.				Overall
Team	W		L	PCT	W		L	PCT
Murray State	14	–	4	.778	23	–	9	.719
Morehead State †	13	–	5	.722	25	–	9	.735
Austin Peay	13	–	5	.722	20	–	14	.588
Tennessee Tech	12	–	6	.667	20	–	13	.606
Tennessee State	10	–	8	.556	14	–	16	.467
Eastern Kentucky	9	–	9	.500	15	–	16	.484
UT Martin	6	–	12	.333	12	–	21	.364
Southeast Missouri State	6	–	12	.333	10	–	22	.313
Eastern Illinois	4	–	14	.222	9	–	20	.310
Jacksonville State	3	–	15	.167	5	–	25	.167
SIU Edwardsville*	0	–	0	–	8	–	21	.276
† 2011 OVC tournament winner As of March 17, 2011 * Ineligible (in transition) Rankings from AP Poll

The 2010–11 Morehead State Eagles men's basketball team represented Morehead State University during the 2010–11 NCAA Division I men's basketball season. The Eagles, led by 5th year head coach Donnie Tyndall, played their home games at Ellis Johnson Arena and are members of the Ohio Valley Conference. They finished the season 25–10, 13–5 in Ohio Valley play and were champions of the 2011 Ohio Valley Conference men's basketball tournament to earn an automatic bid in the 2011 NCAA Division I men's basketball tournament. As a 13 seed, they upset 4 seed Louisville before falling to 12 seed Richmond in the third round.

== Roster ==
Number	Name	Position	Height	Weight	Year	Hometown
00	Drew Kelly	Forward	6–7	235	Freshman	Franklin, Tennessee
3	Kevin Gray	Guard	5–10	175	Freshman	Reynoldsburg, Ohio
5	Reggie Williams	Guard	6–2	180	Freshman	Virginia Beach, Virginia
10	Lamont Austin	Guard	6–0	175	Junior	Topeka, Kansas
11	Terrance Hill	Guard	6–1	175	Junior	Columbus, Georgia
13	Ty Proffitt	Guard	6–4	190	Junior	London, Kentucky
14	Taylor Maze	Guard	6–1	173	Freshman	Owingsville, Kentucky
21	Dionte Ferguson	Forward	6–7	215	Freshman	Prattville, Alabama
22	Demonte Harper	Guard	6–4	195	Senior	Nashville, Tennessee
23	Arthur McMillian	Forward	6–6	235	Freshman	Nashville, Tennessee
33	Romaric Lasme	Forward	6–7	215	Junior	Port-Gentil, Gabon
34	Sam Goodman	Guard	6–2	190	Senior	Lawrenceville, Georgia
35	Kenneth Faried	Forward/Center	6–8	228	Senior	Newark, New Jersey

== Schedule ==
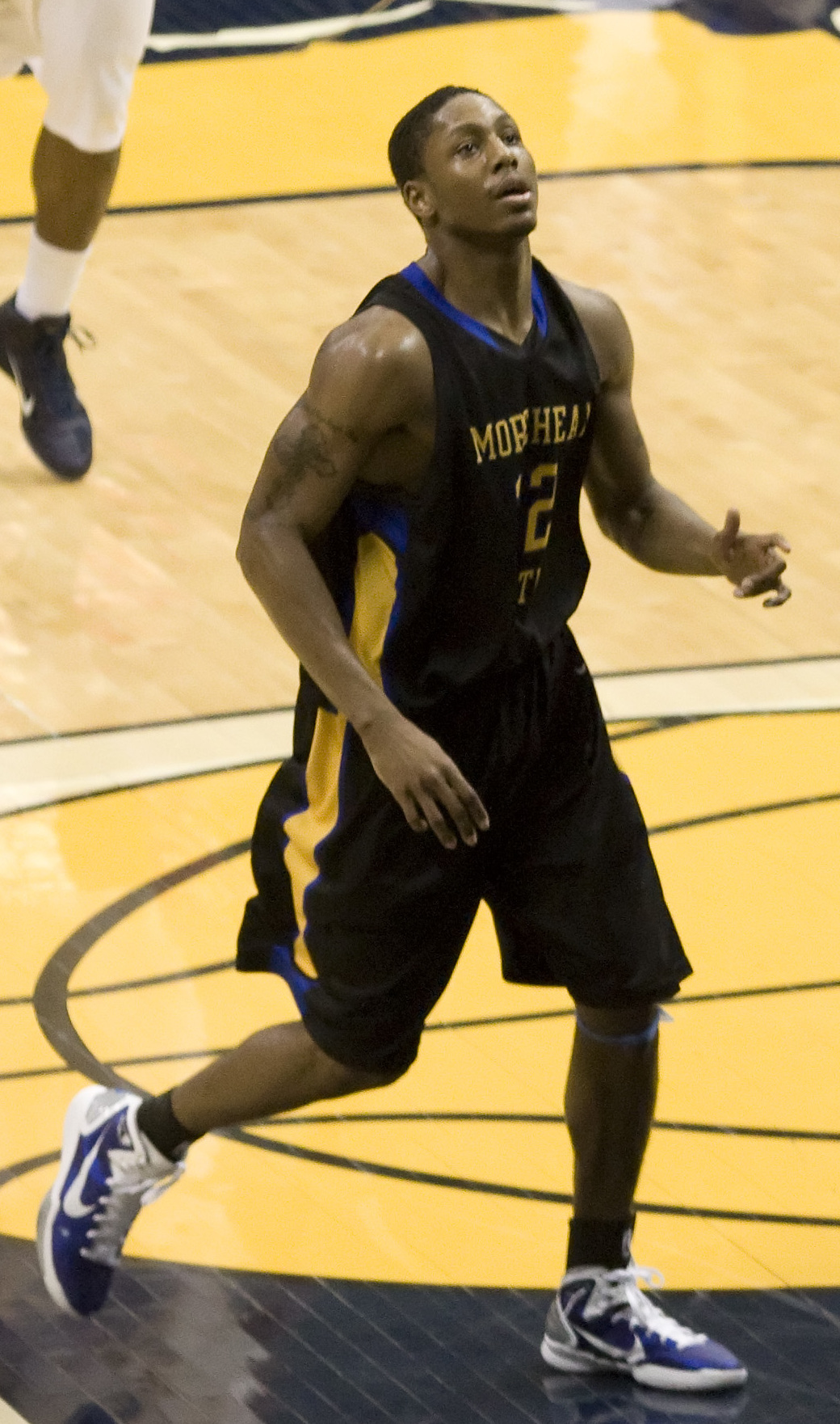
Demonte Harper

Date time, TV	Rank^{#}	Opponent^{#}	Result	Record	Site (attendance) city, state
Exhibition
11/4/10*; 7:00 pm		Centre	W 92–49	–	Ellis Johnson Arena; Morehead, KY
11/9/10*; 7:00 pm		Mountain State	W 95–76	–	Ellis Johnson Arena; Morehead, KY
Regular season
11/12/10*; 7:00 pm		Asbury	W 90–49	1–0	Ellis Johnson Arena; Morehead, KY
11/14/10*; 2:00 pm		North Carolina A&T	W 84–61	2–0	Ellis Johnson Arena; Morehead, KY
11/18/10*; 7:00 pm		UNC Wilmington	L 58–60	2–1	Ellis Johnson Arena; Morehead, KY
11/21/10*; 3:30 pm, FSS		at No. 9 Florida; Global Sports Invitational	L 55–61	2–2	O'Connell Center; Gainesville, FL
11/23/10*; 7:00 pm, ESPN3		at No. 3 Ohio State; Global Sports Invitational	L 45–64	2–3	Value City Arena (12,305); Columbus, OH
11/28/10*; 5:00 pm		SIU Edwardsville	W 83–64	3–3	Ellis Johnson Arena; Morehead, KY
12/2/10; 7:45 pm		UT Martin	W 70–49	4–3 (1–0)	Ellis Johnson Arena; Morehead, KY
12/4/10; 8:07 pm		Murray State	W 75–65	5–3 (2–0)	Ellis Johnson Arena; Morehead, KY
12/7/10*; 7:00 pm		St. Catharine	W 77–64	6–3	Ellis Johnson Arena; Morehead, KY
12/11/10*; 8:00 pm		at Northern Iowa	L 53–69	6–4	McLeod Center (3,820); Cedar Falls, IA
12/19/10; 6:00 pm		at Tennessee State	L 64–70	6–5 (2–1)	Gentry Complex; Nashville, TN
12/21/10; 8:30 pm		at Austin Peay	L 85–86 ^{OT}	6–6 (2–2)	Dunn Center (2,686); Clarksville, TN
12/28/10*; 7:00 pm		Kent State	W 76–59	7–6	Ellis Johnson Arena (2,328); Morehead, KY
12/30/10*; 7:00 pm		Binghamton	W 80–74	8–6	Ellis Johnson Arena; Morehead, KY
1/2/11*; 4:30 pm		College of Charleston	W 69–49	9–6	Ellis Johnson Arena (3,172); Morehead, KY
1/6/11; 7:45 pm		Tennessee Tech	W 76–64	10–6 (3–2)	Ellis Johnson Arena (2,206); Morehead, KY
1/8/11; 7:30 pm		Jacksonville State	W 73–52	11–6 (4–2)	Ellis Johnson Arena; Morehead, KY
1/13/11; 8:30 pm		at Southeast Missouri State	W 76–63	12–6 (5–2)	Show Me Center; Cape Girardeau, MO
1/15/11; 7:00 pm		at Eastern Illinois	L 40–47	12–7 (5–3)	Lantz Arena; Charleston, IL
1/22/11; 1:00 pm, ESPNU		Eastern Kentucky	L 49–59	12–8 (5–4)	Ellis Johnson Arena; Morehead, KY
1/24/11*; 7:00 pm		at Ball State	W 50–48	13–8	Worthen Arena; Muncie, IN
1/27/11; 7:45 pm		Tennessee State	W 72–65	14–8 (6–4)	Ellis Johnson Arena; Morehead, KY
1/29/11; 7:15 pm		Austin Peay	W 69–56	15–8 (7–4)	Ellis Johnson Arena (4,909); Morehead, KY
2/3/11; 8:45 pm		at Jacksonville State	W 78–72	16–8 (8–4)	Pete Mathews Coliseum; Jacksonville, AL
2/5/11; 8:30 pm		at Tennessee Tech	W 76–60	17–8 (9–4)	Eblen Center (2,753); Cookeville, TN
2/10/11; 7:45 pm		Eastern Illinois	W 81–65	18–8 (10–4)	Ellis Johnson Arena; Morehead, KY
2/12/11; 7:45 pm		Southeast Missouri State	W 64–52	19–8 (11–4)	Ellis Johnson Arena; Morehead, KY
2/16/11; 7:00 pm		at Eastern Kentucky	W 76–68	20–8 (12–4)	McBrayer Arena; Richmond, KY
2/19/11*; 1:05 pm		at Indiana State; ESPN BracketBusters	W 71–65	21–8	Hulman Center (5,370); Terre Haute, IN
2/24/11; 9:00 pm, ESPNU		at Murray State	L 62–70	21–9 (12–5)	CFSB Center; Murray, KY
2/26/11; 7:00 pm		at UT Martin	W 77–64	22–9 (13–5)	Skyhawk Arena; Martin, TN
Ohio Valley Conference Basketball tournament
3/4/11; 10:45 pm, ESPNU	(2)	vs. (3) Austin Peay; Semifinals	W 68–49	23–9	Nashville Municipal Auditorium (3,592); Nashville, TN
3/5/11; 8:00 pm, ESPN2	(2)	vs. (4) Tennessee Tech; Championship	W 80–73	24–9	Nashville Municipal Auditorium (1,345); Nashville, TN
NCAA tournament
3/17/11*; 1:40 pm, TBS	(13 SW)	vs. (4 SW) No. 14 Louisville; Second Round	W 62–61	25–9	Pepsi Center (18,499); Denver, CO
3/19/11*; 5:15 pm, CBS	(13 SW)	vs. (12 SW) Richmond; Third Round	L 48–65	25–10	Pepsi Center (19,328); Denver, CO
*Non-conference game. ^{#}Rankings from AP Poll. (#) Tournament seedings in parentheses. All times are in Eastern Time.
