= Brett Roberts =

American basketball player (born 1970)

Personal information
- Born: March 24, 1970 (age 56) Portsmouth, Ohio, U.S.
- Listed height: 6 ft 8 in (2.03 m)
- Listed weight: 230 lb (104 kg)

Career information
- High school: South Webster (South Webster, Ohio)
- College: Morehead State (1988–1992)
- NBA draft: 1992: 2nd round, 54th overall pick
- Drafted by: Sacramento Kings
- Position: Small forward

Career highlights
- NCAA scoring champion (1992); OVC Player of the Year (1992); First-team All-OVC (1992)
- Stats at Basketball Reference

Brett Roberts (born March 24, 1970) is an American former basketball player best remembered for leading NCAA Division I in scoring as a senior in 1991–92 and then getting selected by the Sacramento Kings in that year's NBA draft, although he ultimately never played a game in the league. Roberts grew up in Portsmouth, Ohio and attended South Webster High School before moving on to play for Morehead State University's basketball team.

A 6 ft 8 in (2.03 m) small forward, Roberts averaged 16.7 points per game for his four-year career. Through his first three seasons he averaged no more than around 14 points per game. Then, in his senior season in 1991–92, Roberts jumped from an average of 14.5 per game the year before to a nation-leading 28.1 points per game, doubling his output in a single season. He was named the Ohio Valley Conference Men's Basketball Player of the Year and was selected with the final pick of the 1992 NBA draft.

== Baseball career ==
Despite being drafted, Roberts never made any NBA teams' final rosters. He eventually became the principal at his old high school, forgoing any professional aspirations. In 1991, Roberts was also selected by the Minnesota Twins in the fourth round (103rd overall) of the Major League Baseball amateur entry draft.

=== Teams ===
- Elizabethton Twins (1991)
- Kenosha Twins (1992)
- Fort Myers Miracle (1993–1994)
- Nashville Xpress (1994)
- Hardware City Rock Cats (1995)
- Salt Lake Buzz (1996–1997)
- Fargo-Moorhead Redhawks (1997)

== See also ==
- List of NCAA Division I men's basketball season scoring leaders
