= 2008–09 Morehead State Eagles men's basketball team =

American college basketball season

2008–09 Morehead State Eagles men's basketball

Ohio Valley Conference Tournament champion

NCAA tournament, Round of 64
- Conference: Ohio Valley Conference
- Record: 20–16 (12–6 OVC)
- Head coach: Donnie Tyndall (3rd season)
- Assistant coaches: Barry Wortman; Chris Moore; Joel Van Meter
- Home arena: Ellis Johnson Arena

2008–09 Ohio Valley Conference men's basketball standings
| | Conf. | | | | Overall |
| Team | W | | L | PCT | W | | L | PCT |
|---|---|---|---|---|---|---|---|---|
| Tennessee–Martin | 14 | – | 4 | .778 | 22 | – | 10 | .688 |
| Murray State | 13 | – | 5 | .722 | 19 | – | 12 | .613 |
| Austin Peay | 13 | – | 5 | .722 | 19 | – | 14 | .576 |
| Morehead State † | 12 | – | 6 | .667 | 20 | – | 16 | .556 |
| Eastern Kentucky | 10 | – | 8 | .556 | 18 | – | 13 | .581 |
| Tennessee State | 9 | – | 9 | .500 | 12 | – | 18 | .400 |
| Eastern Illinois | 8 | – | 10 | .444 | 12 | – | 18 | .400 |
| Tennessee Tech | 6 | – | 12 | .333 | 12 | – | 18 | .400 |
| Jacksonville State | 5 | – | 13 | .278 | 11 | – | 17 | .393 |
| Southeast Missouri State | 0 | – | 18 | .000 | 3 | – | 27 | .100 |
† Ohio Valley Conference tournament winner As of April 1, 2009; Rankings from AP Poll

The 2008–09 Morehead State Eagles men's basketball team represented Morehead State University in the 2008–09 NCAA Division I men's basketball season. The Eagles, led by head coach Donnie Tyndall, played their home games at Ellis Johnson Arena in Morehead, Kentucky, as members of the Ohio Valley Conference. The Eagles won the 2009 OVC tournament, earning an automatic bid to the NCAA tournament as a 16th seed in the Midwest region. Morehead State played in the Opening Round game, defeating Alabama 58–43 for the school's first NCAA tournament win since 1984. Their run ended in the following round, losing to top seed Louisville.

== Roster ==
2008–09 Morehead State Eagles men's basketball team
Players
Coaches

| Pos. | # | Name | Height | Weight | Year | Hometown |
|---|---|---|---|---|---|---|
| G | 0 | Carl Taylor | 6 ft 3 in (1.91 m) | 210 lb (95 kg) | Jr | Decatur, Georgia |
| F | 1 | Maze Stallworth | 6 ft 4 in (1.93 m) | 205 lb (93 kg) | Jr | Elizabethtown, Kentucky |
| G | 2 | Cecil Brown | 5 ft 11 in (1.8 m) | 180 lb (82 kg) | Jr | Grand Rapids, Michigan |
| F | 10 | Robert Murry | 5 ft 10 in (1.78 m) | 185 lb (84 kg) | Jr | Cleveland, Georgia |
| G | 11 | Terrance Hill | 6 ft 1 in (1.85 m) | 170 lb (77 kg) | Fr | Columbus, Georgia |
| F | 12 | Andreas Coleman | 6 ft 7 in (2.01 m) | 230 lb (104 kg) | So | Danville, Illinois |
| G | 13 | Ty Proffitt | 6 ft 4 in (1.93 m) | 205 lb (93 kg) | So | London, Kentucky |
| G | 15 | Brandon Shingles | 6 ft 3 in (1.91 m) | 175 lb (79 kg) | Jr | Albany, Georgia |
| G | 20 | David Forrest | 5 ft 9 in (1.75 m) | 155 lb (70 kg) | Fr | Atlanta, Georgia |
| G | 22 | Demonte Harper | 6 ft 4 in (1.93 m) | 175 lb (79 kg) | So | Nashville, Tennessee |
| F/C | 23 | Les Simmons | 6 ft 7 in (2.01 m) | 215 lb (98 kg) | Sr | Mountainville, New York |
| F | 24 | Derick Echols | 6 ft 5 in (1.96 m) | 210 lb (95 kg) | Fr | The Bronx, New York |
| G | 25 | John Lamb | 6 ft 1 in (1.85 m) | 180 lb (82 kg) | So | Indianola, Iowa |
| F | 32 | Steve Peterson | 6 ft 4 in (1.93 m) | 190 lb (86 kg) | Fr | Columbus, Georgia |
| F | 33 | Leon Buchanan | 6 ft 5 in (1.96 m) | 210 lb (95 kg) | Sr | Albany, Georgia |
| F/C | 35 | Kenneth Faried | 6 ft 8 in (2.03 m) | 215 lb (98 kg) | So | Newark, New Jersey |
| C | 44 | Blake Pettit | 6 ft 9 in (2.06 m) | 235 lb (107 kg) | Fr | Morehead, Kentucky |

Head coach

- Donnie Tyndall (Morehead State)

Assistant coach(es)

- Barry Wortman (Middle Tennessee)
- Chris Moore (Kentucky State)
- Joel Van Meter (Morehead State)

Legend

- (C) Team captain
- (S) Suspended
- (I) Ineligible
- (W) Walk-on
- Injured
- Current redshirt

Roster
Last update: October 14, 2022

== Schedule and results ==
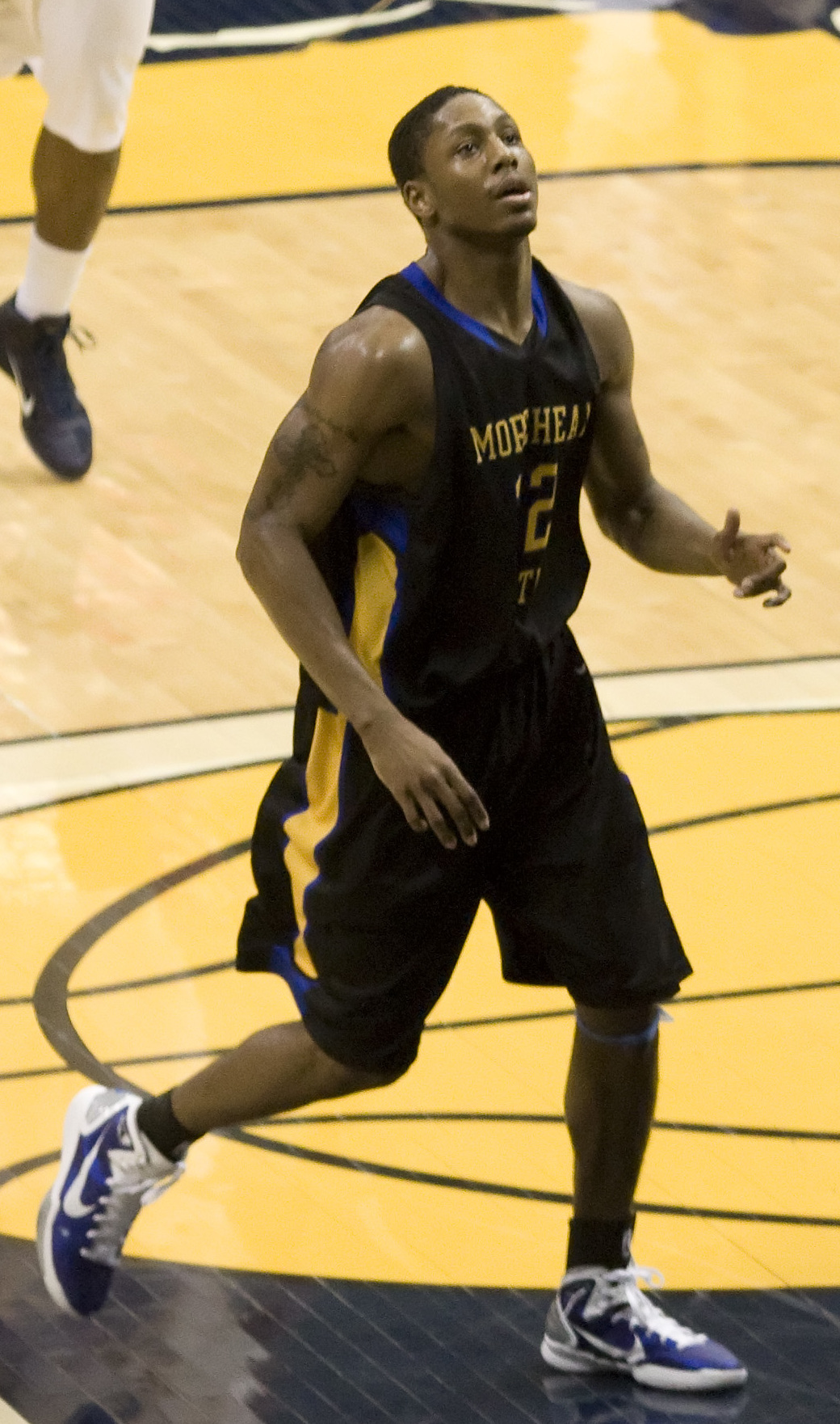
Demonte Harper

| Date time, TV | Rank^{#} | Opponent^{#} | Result | Record | Site city, state |
Regular season
| November 14, 2008*; 8:00 pm | | at Louisiana–Monroe | L 54–56 | 0–1 | Fant–Ewing Coliseum (673); Monroe, LA |
| November 16, 2008*; 5:00 pm | | at Vanderbilt; Cancún Challenge | L 48–74 | 0–2 | Memorial Gymnasium (12,562); Nashville, TN |
| November 19, 2008*; 8:05 pm | | at Drake; Cancún Challenge | L 70–86 | 0–3 | Knapp Center (4,113); Des Moines, IA |
| November 22, 2008*; 5:37 pm | | at No. 3 Louisville; Billy Minardi Classic | L 41–79 | 0–4 | Freedom Hall (19,493); Louisville, KY |
| November 23, 2008*; 1:30 pm | | vs. Florida A&M; Billy Minardi Classic | L 74–79 | 0–5 | Freedom Hall; Louisville, KY |
| November 29, 2008*; 2:00 pm | | vs. Grambling State; Cancún Challenge | L 71–72 | 0–6 | Moon Palace Resort (232); Cancún, Mexico |
| November 30, 2008*; 5:00 pm | | vs. UCF; Cancún Challenge | W 71–65 | 1–6 | Moon Palace Resort (192); Cancún, Mexico |
| December 4, 2008; 7:30 pm | | UT Martin | W 80–71 | 2–6 (1–0) | Ellis Johnson Arena (2,899); Morehead, KY |
| December 6, 2008; 4:15 pm | | Murray State | W 79–74 | 3–6 (2–0) | Ellis Johnson Arena (1,865); Morehead, KY |
| December 14, 2008*; 3:05 pm | | at Illinois State | L 70–76 | 3–7 | Redbird Arena (5,029); Normal, IL |
| December 18, 2008*; 12:00 pm | | James Madison | L 62–74 | 3–8 | Ellis Johnson Arena (4,004); Morehead, KY |
| December 22, 2008*; 7:00 pm | | Kentucky Christian | W 99–39 | 4–8 | Ellis Johnson Arena (1,014); Morehead, KY |
| December 30, 2008*; 7:00 pm | | at East Tennessee State | W 71–61 | 5–8 | Memorial Center (3,138); Johnson City, TN |
| January 3, 2009; 8:30 pm | | at Austin Peay | W 84–74 | 6–8 (3–0) | Dunn Center (3,689); Clarksville, TN |
| January 5, 2009; 8:30 pm | | at Tennessee State | L 64–71 | 6–9 (3–1) | Gentry Center (1,523); Nashville, TN |
| January 8, 2009; 7:30 pm | | Tennessee Tech | W 76–70 | 7–9 (4–1) | Ellis Johnson Arena (1,719); Morehead, KY |
| January 10, 2009; 4:15 pm | | Jacksonville State | W 76–61 | 8–9 (5–1) | Ellis Johnson Arena (1,643); Morehead, KY |
| January 15, 2009; 8:45 pm | | at Southeast Missouri State | W 73–67 | 9–9 (6–1) | Show Me Center (2,348); Cape Girardeau, MO |
| January 17, 2009; 8:00 pm | | at Eastern Illinois | L 61–67 | 9–10 (6–2) | Lantz Arena (968); Charleston, IL |
| January 19, 2009*; 7:00 pm | | Concord | W 81–57 | 10–10 | Ellis Johnson Arena (2,364); Morehead, KY |
| January 24, 2009; 7:30 pm | | Eastern Kentucky | W 68–64 | 11–10 (7–2) | Ellis Johnson Arena (5,350); Morehead, KY |
| January 29, 2009; 9:00 pm | | Tennessee State | W 94–73 | 12–10 (8–2) | Ellis Johnson Arena (4,075); Morehead, KY |
| January 31, 2009; 6:15 pm | | Austin Peay | W 81–63 | 13–10 (9–2) | Ellis Johnson Arena (4,115); Morehead, KY |
| February 5, 2009; 8:30 pm | | at Jacksonville State | L 52–57 | 13–11 (9–3) | Pete Mathews Coliseum (3,298); Jacksonville, AL |
| February 7, 2009; 8:30 pm | | at Tennessee Tech | W 72–64 | 14–11 (10–3) | Eblen Center (1,569); Cookeville, TN |
| February 12, 2009; 7:30 pm | | Eastern Illinois | W 64–48 | 15–11 (11–3) | Ellis Johnson Arena (2,025); Morehead, KY |
| February 14, 2009; 4:15 pm | | Southeast Missouri State | W 79–67 | 16–11 (12–3) | Ellis Johnson Arena (2,252); Morehead, KY |
| February 18, 2009; 7:00 pm | | at Eastern Kentucky | W 74–70 | 16–12 (12–4) | McBrayer Arena (3,800); Richmond, KY |
| February 21, 2009*; 7:00 pm | | at Kent State; ESPN BracketBusters | L 76–79 | 16–13 | MAC Center (4,413); Kent, OH |
| February 26, 2009; 9:00 pm | | at Murray State | L 64–69 | 16–14 (12–5) | Regional Special Events Center (3,195); Murray, KY |
| February 28, 2009; 7:00 pm | | at UT Martin | L 65–79 | 16–15 (12–6) | Skyhawk Arena (4,826); Martin, TN |
Ohio Valley Conference tournament
| March 3, 2009; 7:45 pm | (4) | (5) Eastern Kentucky; OVC Quarterfinals | W 91–72 | 17–15 | Ellis Johnson Arena (2,034); Morehead, KY |
| March 6, 2009; 5:00 pm | (4) | vs. (1) UT Martin; OVC Semifinals | W 63–55 | 18–15 | Sommet Center (3,040); Nashville, TN |
| March 7, 2009; 8:00 pm | (4) | vs. (2) Austin Peay; OVC Championship | W 67–65 ^{2OT} | 19–15 | Sommet Center (1,858); Nashville, TN |
NCAA tournament
| March 17, 2009 | (16 MW) | vs. (16 MW) Alabama State; NCAA Opening Round | W 58–43 | 20–15 | University of Dayton Arena (11,346); Dayton, OH |
| March 20, 2009 | (16 MW) | vs. (1 MW) No. 1 Louisville; NCAA First Round | L 54–74 | 20–16 | University of Dayton Arena (12,499); Dayton, OH |
*Non-conference game. ^{#}Rankings from AP Poll. (#) Tournament seedings in parentheses. All times are in Eastern Time.
