= Kenneth Faried =

American basketball player (born 1989)

- Faried with Baskonia Vitoria-Gasteiz in 2026

No. 35 – Baskonia Vitoria-Gasteiz
- Position: Center
- League: Liga ACB; EuroLeague

Personal information
- Born: November 19, 1989 (age 37) Newark, New Jersey, U.S.
- Listed height: 2.02 m (6 ft 8 in)
- Listed weight: 103 kg (227 lb)

Career information
- High school: Technology (Newark, New Jersey)
- College: Morehead State (2007–2011)
- NBA draft: 2011: 1st round, 22nd overall pick
- Drafted by: Denver Nuggets
- Playing career: 2011–present

Career history
- 2011–2018: Denver Nuggets
- 2018–2019: Brooklyn Nets
- 2019: Houston Rockets
- 2019: Zhejiang Lions
- 2021: Leones de Ponce
- 2021: CSKA Moscow
- 2021–2022: Grand Rapids Gold
- 2022: Austin Spurs
- 2022–2023: Mexico City Capitanes
- 2023: Santurce Crabbers
- 2023–2024: Mexico City Capitanes
- 2024: Leones de Ponce
- 2024: Soles de Mexicali
- 2024–2025: Reggiana
- 2025: Santurce Crabbers
- 2025: TSG GhostHawks
- 2025–2026: Panathinaikos
- 2026: Santurce Crabbers
- 2026–present: Baskonia Vitoria-Gasteiz

Career highlights
- NBA All-Rookie First Team (2012); Greek Cup winner (2026); FIBA Champions League rebounding leader (2025); Consensus second-team All-American (2011); NABC Defensive Player of the Year (2011); NCAA rebounding leader (2011); 2× OVC Player of the Year (2010, 2011); 3× OVC Defensive Player of the Year (2009–2011); 3× First-team All-OVC (2009–2011)
- Stats at NBA.com
- Stats at Basketball Reference
Medals
Men's basketball
Representing United States
World Cup
Gold medal – first place	2014 Spain	Team

Kenneth Bernard Faried Lewis (/fərˈiːd/ fə-REED; born November 19, 1989) is an American professional basketball player for Baskonia Vitoria-Gasteiz of the Liga ACB and the EuroLeague. Known as "the Manimal" due to his hustle on the court, he attended Morehead State University for four years, twice being named the Ohio Valley Conference Player of the Year. He finished his collegiate career as the NCAA all-time leading rebounder in the post-1973 era with 1,673 rebounds, although he was surpassed by Armando Bacot in 2024. He was selected 22nd overall in the 2011 NBA draft by the Denver Nuggets.

Faried played for the United States national team at the 2014 FIBA Basketball World Cup, where he won a gold medal and was named to the All-Tournament Team.

== High school career ==
Faried attended Technology High School in Newark, New Jersey. Due to his lanky physique and low standardized test scores, he was not heavily recruited out of high school, only receiving interest from Iona College, Marist College, and Morehead State University. He ultimately chose to attend Morehead State, citing their persistence as the deciding factor.

== College career ==
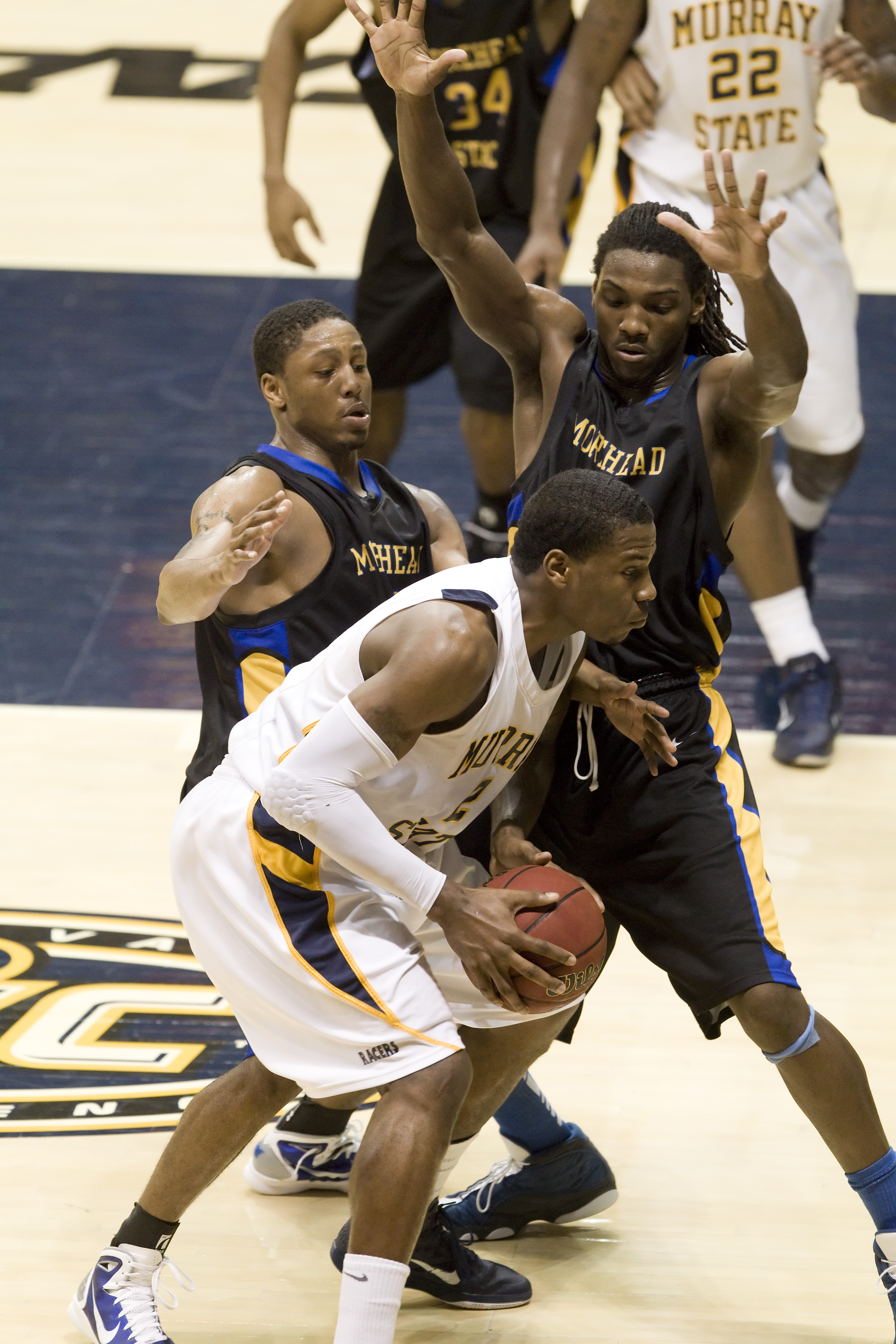
Faried (hands up) with Morehead State in February 2011

A 6 ft 8 in (2.03 m) post player, Faried arrived at Morehead State in 2007. He led the Ohio Valley Conference in rebounding as both a sophomore and a junior (13.0 rebounds per game in each season) – ranking him third in the NCAA in 2008–09 and second in 2009–10. Faried also chipped in double-digit scoring in each of his three varsity seasons.

Faried also led the Eagles to team success, as Morehead claimed a berth in the 2009 NCAA tournament by winning the Ohio Valley Conference tournament. He led the way in the conference championship, his 15 points and 17 rebounds in its final against Austin Peay earning him the tournament's MVP. In his junior year Faried again led the Eagles to the post-season, as they advanced to the second round of the College Basketball Invitational. At the end of the season, Faried was named OVC Player and Defensive Player of the Year and an AP honorable mention All-American. He also passed 1000 rebounds for his career.

After his junior season, Faried declared himself eligible for the 2010 NBA draft. However, he elected to return as a senior, and went on to break Tim Duncan's modern-era (post-1973) Division I career rebounding record of 1,570 rebounds. The mark, which had stood since 1997, fell to Faried's 12 rebounds in the Eagles' 71–65 victory over Indiana State on February 19, 2011. Morehead State again won the Ohio Valley conference tournament, earning a 13 seed in the 2011 NCAA tournament. Led by the play of Faried, Morehead State pulled off a huge upset in the first round of the tournament, toppling the 4 seed Louisville Cardinals. Faried ended his collegiate career with 1,673 rebounds.

In his senior season, Faried was named a second-team All-American by the United States Basketball Writers Association and Fox Sports.

On April 1, 2011, Faried was named the most valuable player of the Reese's College All-Star Game.

=== College awards and honors ===
- Consensus second team All-American (2011)
- NABC Defensive Player of the Year (2011)
- 2× OVC Player of the Year (2010–2011)
- OVC tournament MVP (2009)
- Reese's College All-Star Game MVP (2011)
- 3× All-OVC First Team (2009–2011)
- 3× OVC Defensive Player of the Year (2009–2011)
- OVC All-Newcomer Team (2008)
- NCAA all-time rebounding leader (1,673 rebounds) (post-1973)

== Professional career ==
=== Denver Nuggets (2011–2018) ===
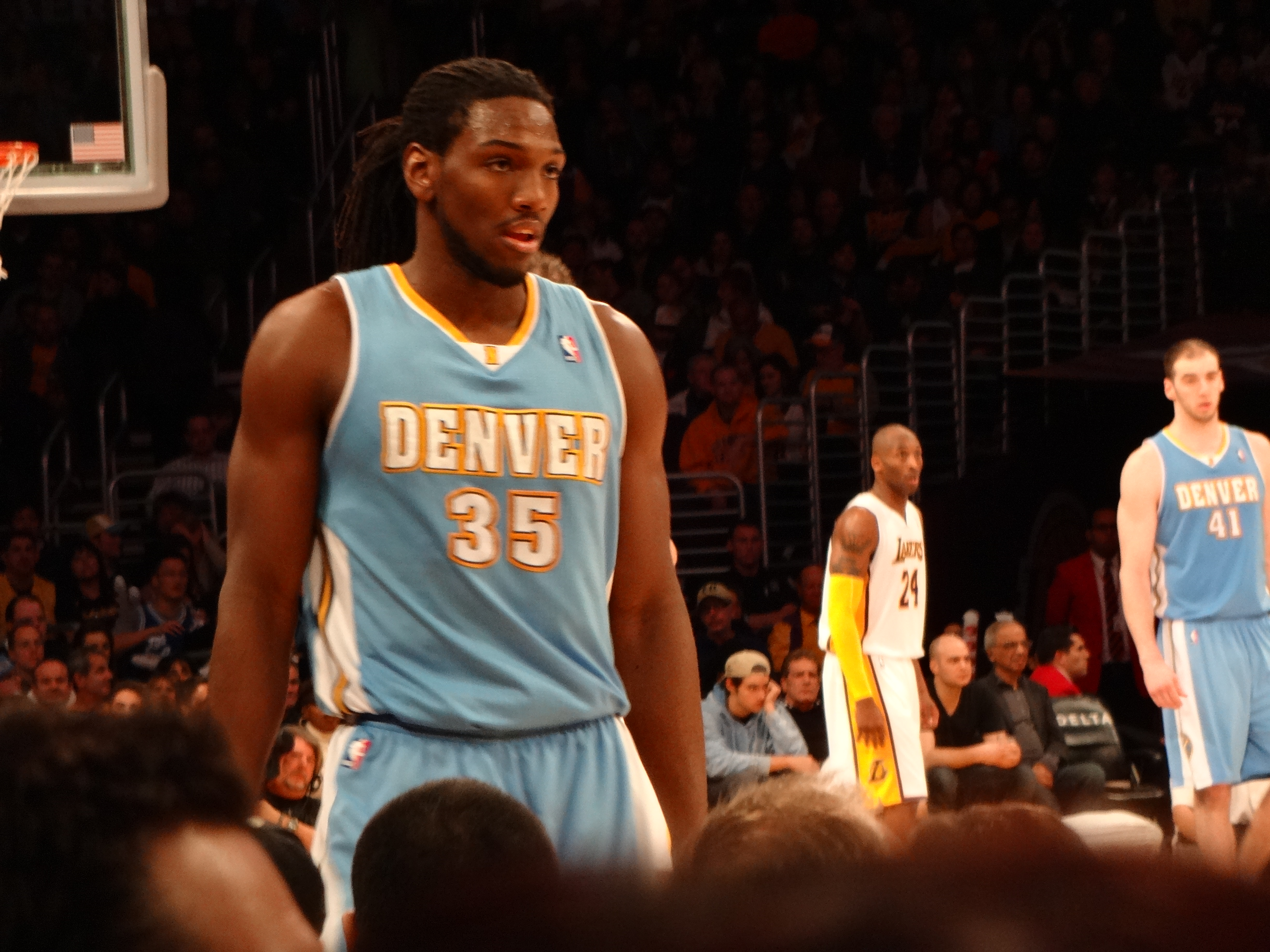
Faried with the Nuggets in January 2013

On June 23, 2011, Faried was selected by the Denver Nuggets with the 22nd overall pick in the 2011 NBA draft. Prior to his rookie season, he earned the nickname "Manimal", for playing hard and fearlessly. He appeared in 46 games (39 starts) in his rookie year, recording 10.2 points and 7.7 rebounds per game in 22.5 minutes. He posted career highs of 27 points and 17 rebounds against the Golden State Warriors on April 9, 2012, becoming the first player in the shot-clock era to have at least 27 points and 17 rebounds while playing less than 25 minutes. He went on to be named Western Conference Rookie of the Month for April. He finished third in NBA Rookie of the Year voting for the 2011–12 season, and earned NBA All-Rookie Team honors.

On November 12, 2012, Faried was named Western Conference Player of the Week for games played Monday, November 5, through Sunday, November 11. It was his first and only player of the week award of his career. Three days later, he posted 16 points and a career-high 20 rebounds (career-high 11 offensive) in 36 minutes against the Miami Heat. On December 12, he recorded a season-high 26 points, 14 rebounds and career-high three steals in 38 minutes against the Minnesota Timberwolves. On February 15, 2013, he was named MVP of the Rising Stars Challenge, where he recorded 40 points and 10 rebounds in 22 minutes for the winning side as Team Chuck beat Team Shaq 163–135. He also competed in the 2013 Sprite Slam Dunk Contest, but was eliminated in the team round.

On February 3, 2014, Faried recorded a career-high 28 points to go along with 11 rebounds against the Los Angeles Clippers. He registered a new career high with 32 points on 14-of-20 shooting and grabbed 13 rebounds against the Los Angeles Lakers on March 7. He posted 34 points and grabbed 13 rebounds in 27 minutes on April 2 against the New Orleans Pelicans, becoming the first player in NBA history to record those numbers while playing 27 minutes or less. He recorded 24 points to go along with a career-high 21 rebounds against the Utah Jazz on April 12.

On October 8, 2014, Faried signed a multi-year contract extension with the Nuggets. On December 26, he had a career-high 25 rebounds to go along with 26 points, as the Nuggets beat the Timberwolves 106–102. On April 12, 2015, he scored a season-high 30 points in a 122–111 win over the Sacramento Kings.

On November 3, 2015, Faried scored a season-high 28 points in a 120–109 win over the Lakers. On March 6, 2016, he recorded 25 points and a season-high 20 rebounds in a 116–114 overtime win over the Dallas Mavericks.

Faried suffered through a sore back for much of the 2016–17 season and caused him to miss 15 games overall, most of which were in February, March and the final games in April. He played through the pain in many others. He played in 61 games overall with averages of 9.6 points and 7.5 rebounds in 21.2 minutes, all career lows.

Faried's role shifted to the bench over his final two years in Denver, especially after the Nuggets traded for Mason Plumlee and signed NBA All-Star Paul Millsap and reserve Trey Lyles as the backup Power Forward in 2017. Displeased, Faried insisted that he is "not a bench player" and that he is "a starter". With Faried's role diminishing in the 2017–18 NBA season, he averaged career lows of 5.9 points and 4.8 rebounds per contest in just 32 games.

=== Brooklyn Nets (2018–2019) ===
On July 13, 2018, Faried was traded, along with Darrell Arthur, a protected 2019 first-round draft pick and a 2020 second-round draft pick, to his hometown team the Brooklyn Nets in exchange for Isaiah Whitehead. On January 19, 2019, he was waived by the Nets.

=== Houston Rockets (2019) ===
On January 21, 2019, Faried signed with the Houston Rockets for the rest of the season.

=== Zhejiang Guangsha Lions (2019) ===
On November 6, 2019, Faried was reported to have signed with the Zhejiang Lions. After appearing in seven games, Faried was reported to have his contract with the Zhejiang Lions terminated on December 4. The Lions' lack of recovery tools and resources caused Faried to return to the U.S. as a free agent.

=== Leones de Ponce (2021) ===
On August 3, 2021, Faried was included on the roster of the Portland Trail Blazers for the 2021 NBA Summer League. On October 1, he signed with Leones de Ponce of the Baloncesto Superior Nacional. In notable fashion, he provided a game-winning help-side block against Cariduros de Fajardo in his debut.

=== CSKA Moscow (2021) ===
On October 1, 2021, Faried signed with CSKA Moscow of the VTB United League and the EuroLeague. He parted ways with the team on December 17, after averaging only 2.6 points and 2.3 rebounds per game.

=== Grand Rapids Gold (2021–2022) ===
On December 29, 2021, Faried was claimed by the Grand Rapids Gold of the NBA G League. On March 15, 2022, he was waived.

=== Austin Spurs (2022) ===
On November 11, 2022, Faried was claimed by the Austin Spurs. On December 13, he was waived.

=== Mexico City Capitanes (2022–2023) ===
On December 27, 2022, Faried was acquired by the Mexico City Capitanes.

=== Santurce Crabbers (2023) ===
On May 3, 2023, Faried signed with Santurce Crabbers of the Puerto Rican league.

=== Return to Mexico City (2023–2024) ===
On October 30, 2023, Faried re-signed with the Mexico City Capitanes.

=== Return to Ponce (2024) ===
On October 27, 2023, it was announced that Faried would return to the Cangrejeros de Santurce for the 2024 season. However, he never played for them, instead signing with the Leones de Ponce on July 17, 2024.

=== Pallacanestro Reggiana (2024–2025) ===
On November 28, 2024, he signed with Pallacanestro Reggiana of the Italian Lega Basket Serie A (LBA).

=== TSG GhostHawks (2025) ===
On October 8, 2025, Faried signed with the TSG GhostHawks of the P. League+ in Taiwan.

=== Panathinaikos (2025–2026) ===
On 9 November 2025, Faried signed a two-month contract with EuroLeague powerhouse Panathinaikos to cover the gap left by the simultaneous injuries of the team's three centers: Mathias Lessort, Ömer Yurtseven, and Richaun Holmes.

Despite initial doubts about his age, form and fitness, he was named MVP of his first EuroLeague game against Paris Basketball on 12 November 2025, recording a double-double with 18 points, 12 rebounds, and 3 blocks, helping the team secure a decisive victory. On top of that, two days later, he was again a key player to Panathinaikos victory at Real Madrid with a near double-double game of 16 points and 8 rebounds, having also the game highlight with a poster dunk against Edy Tavares, Euroleague's premier rim protector.

=== Santurce Crabbers (2026) ===
On June 22, 2026, Faried joined the Santurce Crabbers, a team he previously played for in 2025, to finish off the 2026 BSN season. On June 23, he had his season debut, where he had a dominant 23 point, 14 rebound debut in a very competitive win against the Gigantes de Carolina.

In game 3 of the BSN playoffs with the series tied 1–1 against the Criollos de Caguas, Kenneth had a monster 17-point, 23-rebound performance, leading Santurce to a 105–100 overtime victory.

=== Baskonia Vitoria-Gasteiz (2026–present) ===
On August 25, 2026, Faried signed with Baskonia Vitoria-Gasteiz of the Liga ACB and the EuroLeague.

== National team career ==
Faried was a member of the United States national team that won the 2014 FIBA Basketball World Cup; Faried was also named to the All-Tournament team. He was also one of the 30 finalists for their 2016 Olympic team.

== Career statistics ==
Legend
GP	Games played	GS	Games started	MPG	Minutes per game
FG%	Field goal percentage	3P%	3-point field goal percentage	FT%	Free throw percentage
RPG	Rebounds per game	APG	Assists per game	SPG	Steals per game
BPG	Blocks per game	PPG	Points per game	**Bold**	Career high

=== NBA ===
==== Regular season ====
Year	Team	GP	GS	MPG	FG%	3P%	FT%	RPG	APG	SPG	BPG	PPG
2011–12	Denver	46	39	22.5	.586	.000	.665	7.7	.8	.7	**1.0**	10.2
2012–13	Denver	**80**	**80**	**28.1**	.552	.000	.613	**9.2**	1.0	**1.0**	**1.0**	11.5
2013–14	Denver	**80**	77	27.2	.545	.000	.650	8.6	**1.2**	.9	.9	**13.7**
2014–15	Denver	75	71	27.8	.507	.125	.691	8.9	**1.2**	.8	.8	12.6
2015–16	Denver	67	64	25.3	.558	**.500**	.613	8.7	**1.2**	.5	.9	12.5
2016–17	Denver	61	34	21.2	.549	.000	.693	7.5	.9	.7	.7	9.6
2017–18	Denver	32	7	14.4	.514	.000	**.706**	4.8	.6	.4	.4	5.9
2018–19	Brooklyn	12	0	9.8	**.595**	.200	.649	3.7	.2	.2	.3	5.1
2018–19	Houston	25	13	24.4	.587	.350	.651	8.2	.7	.6	.8	12.9
Career		478	385	24.5	.546	.222	.654	8.1	1.0	.7	.8	11.4

==== Playoffs ====
Year	Team	GP	GS	MPG	FG%	3P%	FT%	RPG	APG	SPG	BPG	PPG
2012	Denver	**7**	**7**	27.4	.533	.000	.750	**10.0**	**0.6**	0.7	**1.1**	**10.4**
2013	Denver	5	4	**29.0**	.625	.000	.733	8.4	0.2	**1.0**	0.2	10.2
2019	Houston	6	0	9.3	**.692**	**1.000**	**.833**	3.5	0.3	0.3	0.0	4.0
Career		18	11	21.8	.581	1.000	.758	7.4	0.4	0.7	0.5	8.2

=== Euroleague ===
Year	Team	GP	GS	MPG	FG%	3P%	FT%	RPG	APG	SPG	BPG	PPG	PIR
2021–22	CSKA Moscow	**7**	0	7.5	.333	1.000	.833	2.4	.0	.1	.0	2.3	1.7
2025–26	Panathinaikos B.C.	35	13	13.0	.313	.000	.655	3.9	0.3	.3	0.6	5.8	7.5
Career		42	13	10.0	.323	.500	.744	3.1	.1	.2	0.3	4.0	4.6

=== College ===
Year	Team	GP	GS	MPG	FG%	3P%	FT%	RPG	APG	SPG	BPG	PPG
2007–08	Morehead State	30	20	20.2	.516	.000	.580	8.0	.3	1.2	.8	10.5
2008–09	Morehead State	**36**	**36**	30.1	.556	**.400**	.577	13.0	**1.4**	**1.9**	1.9	13.9
2009–10	Morehead State	35	32	30.3	.564	.250	**.595**	13.0	.5	1.6	1.9	16.9
2010–11	Morehead State	35	34	**34.7**	**.623**	–	.577	**14.5**	1.1	**1.9**	**2.3**	**17.3**
Career		136	122	29.1	.569	.250	.583	12.3	.9	1.7	1.8	14.8

== Personal life ==
Faried is Muslim.

Faried's father is Kenneth Lewis and Faried's mother is Waudda Faried. Waudda suffers from lupus and diabetes and has undergone a kidney transplant. In 2007 she married Manasin Copeland; they were the fifth same-sex couple to be wed in New Jersey after the state legalized gay and lesbian marriage. Kenneth Faried is a committed straight ally, having worked with the Gay and Lesbian Alliance Against Defamation (GLAAD) and also with Athlete Ally, a group that works to break down homophobia in sports.

Faried has at least four children, including three sons and one daughter. His social-media profile with his partner, Atar Hajali, names three sons (KT, Kenai, and Kiyan) and two daughters (Kyra and Kenzie).

== See also ==
- List of NBA career field goal percentage leaders
- List of NCAA Division I men's basketball season rebounding leaders
- List of NCAA Division I men's basketball career rebounding leaders
- List of NCAA Division I men's basketball players with 2,000 points and 1,000 rebounds
