= Ricky Minard =

American professional basketball player (born 1982)

Personal information
- Born: September 11, 1982 (age 44) Mansfield, Ohio, U.S.
- Listed height: 6 ft 5 in (1.96 m)
- Listed weight: 220 lb (100 kg)

Career information
- High school: Mansfield (Mansfield, Ohio)
- College: Morehead State (2000–2004)
- NBA draft: 2004: 2nd round, 48th overall pick
- Drafted by: Sacramento Kings
- Playing career: 2004–2017
- Position: Shooting guard / small forward

Career history
- 2004–2005: Columbus Riverdragons
- 2005: Biella
- 2005–2007: Reggiana
- 2007–2009: Sutor Montegranaro
- 2009–2010: Virtus Roma
- 2010: Khimki
- 2010–2011: UNICS Kazan
- 2011–2012: Azovmash Mariupol
- 2012: Junior Casale
- 2012–2013: Virtus Bologna
- 2013: Beşiktaş
- 2013–2014: Budivelnyk Kyiv
- 2015: Rouen
- 2015: Göttingen
- 2015–2017: Tampereen Pyrintö

Career highlights
- Eurocup champion (2011); Ukrainian League champion (2014); Ukrainian Cup champion (2014); OVC Player of the Year (2003); 3× First-team All-OVC (2002–2004); Second-team All-OVC (2001); OVC Freshman of the Year (2001)
- Stats at Basketball Reference

Ricky Donell Minard Jr. (born September 11, 1982) is an American former professional basketball player. He is Morehead State's career scoring leader.

== Professional career ==
He was selected by the Sacramento Kings in the 2nd round (48th overall) of the 2004 NBA draft. A 6'4" guard from Morehead State University, Minard was signed by the Kings in July 2004, but they waived him in November the same year, and so far he has never appeared in an NBA game.

Minard started his professional career with Columbus Riverdragons of the NBDL. In January 2005, he left the United States and moved to Italy where he spent next five years playing for Lauretana Biella, Bipop Carire Reggio Emilia, Premiata Montegranaro and Lottomatica Roma.

On March 12, 2010, he signed with Khimki Moscow Region of Russia for the rest of the season. For the 2010–11 season he stayed in Russia but moved to UNICS Kazan. On July 20, 2011, he signed a one-year deal with Azovmash Mariupol of Ukraine. On February 17, 2012, he was released by Azovmash. The same day he signed with Novipiu Casale of Italy for the rest of the season.

On August 28, 2012, he signed with Virtus Bologna of Italy. On February 21, 2012, he left Bologna and signed with Beşiktaş of Turkey for the rest of the season. On July 25, 2013, he signed with Budivelnyk Kyiv of Ukraine for the 2013–14 season.

On January 18, 2015, he signed with French team SPO Rouen Basket. On March 7, 2015, he parted ways with Rouen after appearing in five league games.

On August 20, 2015, he signed with BG Göttingen of Germany. On October 23, 2015, he parted ways due to injury with Göttingen after appearing in two games. On November 13, 2015, he signed with Tampereen Pyrintö of the Finnish Korisliiga. Pyrintö advanced to Korisliiga Finals, where they lost to Kouvot. Following their mutual interest already from the previous season the parties re-signed on August 15, 2016.
