= 2010–11 Murray State Racers men's basketball team =

American college basketball season

2010–11 Murray State Racers men's basketball

OVC Regular Season Champions

NIT, First Round
- Conference: Ohio Valley Conference
- Record: 23–9 (14–4 OVC)
- Head coach: Billy Kennedy
- Assistant coaches: Steve Prohm; Isaac Chew; Tim MacAllister
- Home arena: CFSB Center

2010–11 Ohio Valley Conference men's basketball standings
	Conf.				Overall
Team	W		L	PCT	W		L	PCT
Murray State	14	–	4	.778	23	–	9	.719
Morehead State †	13	–	5	.722	25	–	9	.735
Austin Peay	13	–	5	.722	20	–	14	.588
Tennessee Tech	12	–	6	.667	20	–	13	.606
Tennessee State	10	–	8	.556	14	–	16	.467
Eastern Kentucky	9	–	9	.500	15	–	16	.484
UT Martin	6	–	12	.333	12	–	21	.364
Southeast Missouri State	6	–	12	.333	10	–	22	.313
Eastern Illinois	4	–	14	.222	9	–	20	.310
Jacksonville State	3	–	15	.167	5	–	25	.167
SIU Edwardsville*	0	–	0	–	8	–	21	.276
† 2011 OVC tournament winner As of March 17, 2011 * Ineligible (in transition) Rankings from AP Poll

The 2010–11 Murray State Racers men's basketball team represented Murray State University in the 2010–11 college basketball season. This was head coach Billy Kennedy's fifth season at Murray State. The Racers competed in the Ohio Valley Conference and played their home games at the CFSB Center. They finished the season 23–8, 14–4 in OVC play to capture the regular season championship.

== Roster ==
#	Name	Height	Weight (lbs.)	Position	Class	Hometown	Previous Team(s)
0	Isaac Miles	6'2"	205	G	Sr.	Kansas City, MO, U.S.	Bishop Miege HS
1	B. J. Jenkins	6'0"	180	G	Sr.	Virginia Beach, VA, U.S.	Green Run HS
2	Ed Daniel	6'7"	220	F	So.	Birmingham, AL, U.S.	Woodlawn HS
3	Isaiah Canaan	6'0"	175	G	So.	Biloxi, MS, U.S.	Biloxi HS
4	LaTreze Mushatt	6'5"	210	G	Jr.	Saginaw, MI, U.S.	Saginaw Arthur Hill High School
10	Jordan Burge	5'11"	170	G	So.	Mayfield, KY, U.S.	Northside Baptist HS
11	Donte Poole	6'3"	185	G	Jr.	Las Vegas, NV, U.S.	Mojave High School
12	Shawn Jackson	6'9"	230	C	Fr.	Live Oak, FL, U.S.	Melody Christian Academy
13	Brandon Garrett	6'9"	200	F	Jr.	Phoenix, AZ, U.S.	Paradise Valley
14	Picasso Simmons	6'0"	170	G	Sr.	Gallatin, TN, U.S.	Lee Academy
22	Jeffery McClain	6'6"	230	F	Sr.	Hickman, KY, U.S.	Fulton County HS; Three Rivers CC
24	Jeff Reese	6'4"	180	F	Jr.	Laurel Hill, FL, U.S.	Laurel Hill High School
32	Chris Griffin	6'7"	205	F	Fr.	Tallahassee, FL, U.S.	Leon High School
33	Jewuan Long	6'1"	180	G	So.	Jackson, TN, U.S.	Liberty Tech HS
42	Ivan Aska	6'7"	230	F	So.	Ft. Lauderdale, FL, U.S.	Boyd H. Anderson HS

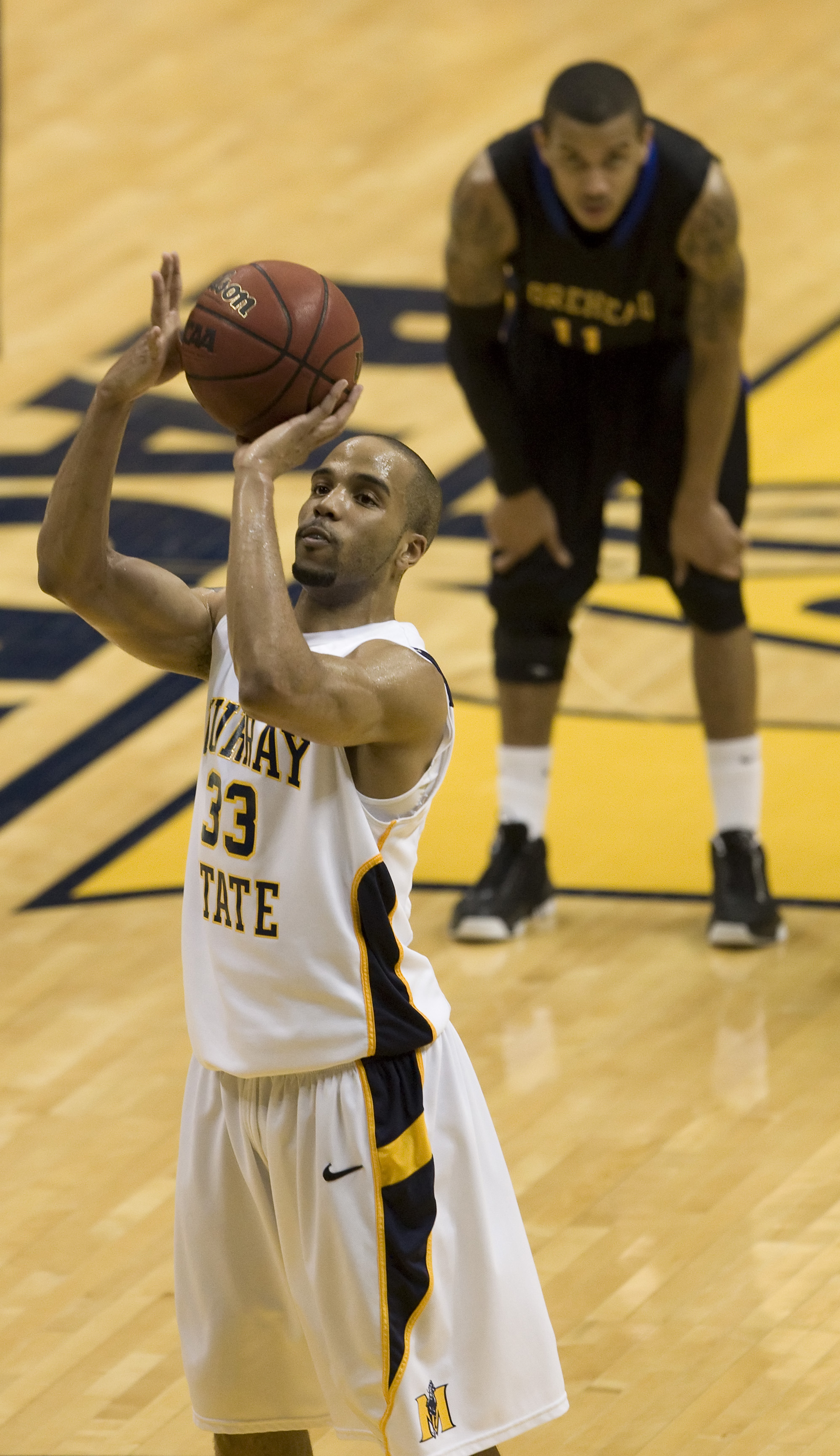
Jewuan Long takes a foul shot.
