= Dan Swartz =

American basketball player (1934–1997)

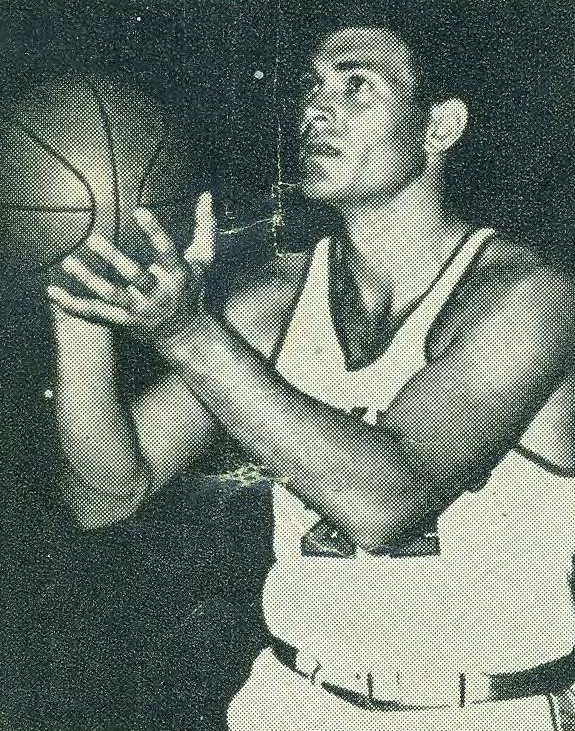
- Swartz with the Wichita Vickers.

Personal information
- Born: December 23, 1934 Owingsville, Kentucky, U.S.
- Died: April 3, 1997 (aged 62)
- Listed height: 6 ft 4 in (1.93 m)
- Listed weight: 215 lb (98 kg)

Career information
- High school: Owingsville (Owingsville, Kentucky)
- College: Kentucky (1951–1952); Morehead State (1953–1956)
- NBA draft: 1956: 4th round, 29th overall pick
- Drafted by: Boston Celtics
- Playing career: 1959–1963
- Position: Power forward
- Number: 12

Career history
- 1959–1960: Wichita Vickers
- 1961: Cleveland Pipers
- 1961–1962: Philadelphia Tapers
- 1962: Los Angeles Jets
- 1962–1963: Boston Celtics

Career highlights
- NBA champion (1963); All-ABL First Team (1962)

Career NBA statistics
- Points: 175 (4.5 ppg)
- Rebounds: 88 (2.3 rpg)
- Assists: 21 (0.5 apg)
- Stats at NBA.com
- Stats at Basketball Reference
Medals
Representing United States
Men's basketball
Pan American Games
Gold medal – first place	1959 Chicago	Team Competition

Daniel S. Swartz (December 23, 1934 – April 3, 1997) was an American basketball player born in Owingsville, Kentucky. He scored 2,088 points in his high school career and was just shy from breaking Wah Wah Jones’ national high school scoring record.

Starting off his career, Swartz played one season at the University of Kentucky before transferring home. The 6-foot-4-inch (1.93 m) forward transferred to Morehead State University, Swartz played one season (1962-63) in the National Basketball Association as a member of the Boston Celtics. He averaged 4.5 points per game and won an NBA Championship ring when the Celtics defeated the Los Angeles Lakers in the 1963 NBA Finals.

When his basketball career came to an end he became the local county sheriff then later to be the field representative for U.S. Rep. Scotty Baesler. With his wife they had 5 children, 4 sons and 1 daughter. At the age of 65 from a sudden heart attack. In 1999, Morehead State University retired Swartz's jersey to be hung in the rafters.

Now his hometown of Owingsville honors him by hosting the "Dan Swartz Classic," a basketball tournament held at Bath County High School.

== Career statistics ==
Legend
GP	Games played	GS	Games started	MPG	Minutes per game
FG%	Field goal percentage	3P%	3-point field goal percentage	FT%	Free throw percentage
RPG	Rebounds per game	APG	Assists per game	SPG	Steals per game
BPG	Blocks per game	PPG	Points per game	**Bold**	Career high
†	Won an NBA championship

=== NBA ===
==== Regular season ====
Year	Team	GP	MPG	FG%	FT%	RPG	APG	PPG
1962–63†	Boston	39	8.6	.380	.847	2.3	.5	4.5

==== Playoffs ====
Year	Team	GP	MPG	FG%	FT%	RPG	APG	PPG
1963†	Boston	1	4.0	–	–	.0	.0	.0
