= Mike Sutton (basketball) =

American basketball coach (born 1956)

Biographical details
- Born: March 21, 1956 (age 70); Farmville, North Carolina, U.S.

Coaching career (HC unless noted)
- 1978–1979: Lees-McRae (asst.)
- 1979–1980: Hoke County HS (asst.)
- 1980–1981: VCU (asst.)
- 1981–1994: Meadowbrook HS
- 1994–1995: Tulsa (asst.)
- 1995–1997: Georgia (asst.)
- 1997–2002: Kentucky (asst.)
- 2002–2011: Tennessee Tech

Accomplishments and honors

Championships
- OVC regular season championship (2005)

Awards
- OVC Coach of the Year (2005); USBWA Most Courageous Award (2006)

Mike Sutton (born March 21, 1956) is a retired American college basketball coach and the former head men's basketball coach at Tennessee Technological University. He took over in 2002, after Jeff Lebo departed to lead the basketball program at the University of Tennessee at Chattanooga.

In April 2005, Sutton was diagnosed with Guillain–Barré syndrome, but he continued to coach, despite having to use a wheelchair.

On March 23, 2011, Sutton announced his retirement and Tennessee Tech promoted associate head coach Steve Payne to head coach.
