= Bret Campbell =

American basketball player and coach

Biographical details
- Born: November 5, 1960 (age 65); Anderson, Indiana, U.S.

Playing career
- 1979–1983: Valdosta State
- Position: Guard

Coaching career (HC unless noted)
- 1983–1985: Valdosta State (asst.)
- 1985–1987: Kennesaw State (asst.)
- 1987–1989: Birmingham–Southern (asst.)
- 1989–1992: UCF (asst.)
- 1992–1999: Austin Peay (asst.)
- 1999–2009: UT Martin
- 2009–2014: Austin Peay (asst.)
- 2014–2018: Chipola College

Bret Ray Campbell (born November 5, 1960) was the head men's basketball coach at Chipola College. He is former head men's basketball coach at University of Tennessee at Martin. He served in this position from 1999 to 2009. Despite being named the Ohio Valley Conference Coach of the Year for the 2008–2009 season, he was asked to resign under pressure by UT-Martin. His record after 10 seasons at UT-Martin was 125–168 (.427)

His record for three seasons at Chipola College was 61–29 (.678) but he resigned for reasons unknown.

Prior to arriving at UT Martin, Campbell served as an assistant coach at Austin Peay, Central Florida, Birmingham–Southern and Kennesaw State. Campbell started his coaching career in 1983 as a graduate assistant at Valdosta State University.

Campbell played basketball at Valdosta State, and was a three-year starter at guard. He left the school as their all-time career leader in assists.
