= 2011 Ohio Valley Conference men's basketball tournament =

- Classification: Division I
- Season: 2010–11
- Teams: 8
- Site: Nashville Municipal Auditorium; Nashville, Tennessee
- Champions: Morehead State (4th title)
- Winning coach: Donnie Tyndall (2nd title)
- Television: ESPNU, ESPN2

2010–11 Ohio Valley Conference men's basketball standings
	Conf.				Overall
Team	W		L	PCT	W		L	PCT
Murray State	14	–	4	.778	23	–	9	.719
Morehead State †	13	–	5	.722	25	–	9	.735
Austin Peay	13	–	5	.722	20	–	14	.588
Tennessee Tech	12	–	6	.667	20	–	13	.606
Tennessee State	10	–	8	.556	14	–	16	.467
Eastern Kentucky	9	–	9	.500	15	–	16	.484
UT Martin	6	–	12	.333	12	–	21	.364
Southeast Missouri State	6	–	12	.333	10	–	22	.313
Eastern Illinois	4	–	14	.222	9	–	20	.310
Jacksonville State	3	–	15	.167	5	–	25	.167
SIU Edwardsville*	0	–	0	–	8	–	21	.276
† 2011 OVC tournament winner As of March 17, 2011 * Ineligible (in transition) Rankings from AP Poll

The 2011 Ohio Valley Conference men's basketball tournament occurred March 2, 3, 4, and 5. All tournament games took place at Nashville Municipal Auditorium in Nashville, Tennessee.

== Format ==
The format for the tournament was changed, beginning with the 2011 tournament. Seeding changed to a merit-based system where the No. 1 and 2 seeds receive a double bye to the semifinals while the No. 3 and 4 seeds get a single bye to the quarterfinals (a system that has been used since 2003 in the West Coast Conference). The first round will match up the No. 5/8 and No. 6/7 seeds. The top eight eligible men's basketball teams in the Ohio Valley Conference receive a berth in the conference tournament. After the 18-game conference season, teams were seeded by conference record. The winner earned an automatic berth in the 2011 NCAA tournament.

== Seeds ==
Only eight Ohio Valley schools qualified for the tournament. Teams were seeded by 2010–11 Ohio Valley Conference record, with a tiebreaker system to seed teams with identical conference records.

Through games of Feb. 26, 2011, the seeds are as follows after implementing tiebreakers:

Seed	School	Conf (Overall)	Tiebreaker
#1	Murray State	14–4 (23–7)	
#2	Morehead State	13–5 (22–9)	1–1 vs AP
#3	Austin Peay	13–5 (19–12)	1–1 vs MORE
#4	Tennessee Tech	12–6 (18–11)	
#5	Tennessee State	10–8 (14–15)	
#6	Eastern Kentucky	9–9 (15–15)	
#7	Southeast Missouri State	6–12 (9–21)	
#8	Tennessee-Martin	6–12 (11–20)	
	Eastern Illinois	4–14 (9–20)	
	Jacksonville State	3–15 (5–25)	
	SIU-Edwardsville	0–0 (8–21)	

== Bracket ==
First round Wednesday, March 2
5	Tennessee State	64
8	UT Martin	68
6	Eastern Kentucky	49
7	Southeast Missouri State	65

Quarterfinals; Thursday, March 3
8	UT Martin	59
4	Tennessee Tech	83
7	Southeast Missouri State	60
3	Austin Peay	76

Semifinals; Friday, March 4
4	Tennessee Tech	64
1	Murray State	59
3	Austin Peay	49
2	Morehead State	68

Championship; Saturday, March 5
4	Tennessee Tech	73
2	Morehead State	80

== Outcome ==
Morehead State defeated Tennessee Tech, 80–73 in the final of the Ohio Valley Conference tournament in Nashville. They moved on to their second NCAA tournament in the past three years and fourth overall. In the tournament, they upset Louisville in the first round before losing to Richmond in the second round. The favorite to face Morehead St. in the finals was the #1 seed and their top rival, Murray St., but they lost to Tennessee Tech in semifinals, 64–59.
