= Bob McCann =

American basketball player (1964–2011)

Personal information
- Born: April 22, 1964 Morristown, New Jersey
- Died: July 1, 2011 (aged 47) North Carolina
- Listed height: 6 ft 6 in (1.98 m)
- Listed weight: 244 lb (111 kg)

Career information
- High school: Morristown (Morristown, New Jersey)
- College: Upsala (1982–1983); Morehead State (1984–1987)
- NBA draft: 1987: 2nd round, 32nd overall pick
- Drafted by: Milwaukee Bucks
- Playing career: 1987–2002
- Position: Power forward / small forward
- Number: 30, 55, 7

Career history
- 1987: Staten Island Stallions
- 1987: New Jersey Jammers
- 1987–1988: CD Cajamadrid
- 1988–1989: Charleston Gunners
- 1989–1990: Pensacola Tornados
- 1990: Dallas Mavericks
- 1990–1991: CB OAR Ferrol
- 1991: Pensacola Tornados
- 1991–1992: Detroit Pistons
- 1992–1993: Minnesota Timberwolves
- 1993–1994: Aresium Milan
- 1994–1995: Rapid City Thrillers
- 1995–1996: Washington Bullets
- 1996–1997: Besançon BCD
- 1997: Polluelos de Aibonito
- 1997: Meysuspor Istanbul
- 1998: Toronto Raptors
- 1998: Sioux Falls Skyforce
- 1998: Brujos de Guayama
- 1998–1999: Ourense
- 1999: Purefoods Tender Juicy Hotdogs
- 1999–2000: Ourense
- 2000–2001: Tenerife CB
- 2001–2002: Boca Juniors

Career statistics
- Points (NBA): 739 (4.2 ppg)
- Rebounds (NBA): 468 (2.6 rpg)
- Assists (NBA): 104 (0.6 apg)
- Stats at NBA.com
- Stats at Basketball Reference

Robert Glen McCann (April 22, 1964 – July 1, 2011) was an American professional basketball player. He was listed as a power forward at 6'7" (or 6'6") and 244–248 lb. McCann died of heart failure in July 2011.

McCann was born in Morristown, New Jersey. He attended Upsala College, a Division III school, for one academic year (1982–83) and then transferred to Division I Morehead State University, where he played for three seasons (from 1984 to 1987; after having dropped the 1983–84 season as a transfer student). He was selected with the 32nd overall pick in the 1987 NBA draft, and played in the NBA intermittently for five seasons (from 1989–90 until 1997–98) with five different teams (Dallas Mavericks, Detroit Pistons, Minnesota Timberwolves, Washington Bullets and Toronto Raptors), averaging 4.2 points and 2.6 rebounds per game. He played as well in the USBL and CBA leagues in the country, and abroad in Spain, France, Puerto Rico, Turkey and Argentina.
