= Morehead State Eagles men's basketball =

College basketball team

2026–27 Morehead State Eagles men's basketball team
- University: Morehead State University
- Head coach: Jonathan Mattox (3rd season)
- Location: Morehead, Kentucky
- Arena: Ellis Johnson Arena (capacity: 6,500)
- Conference: Ohio Valley
- Nickname: Eagles
- Colors: Blue and gold
- All-time record: 1275-1182 (.519)

NCAA Division I tournament Sweet Sixteen
- 1956, 1961

NCAA Division I tournament appearances
- 1956, 1957, 1961, 1983, 1984, 2009, 2011, 2021, 2024

Conference tournament champions
- 1983, 1984, 2009, 2011, 2021, 2024

Conference regular-season champions
- 1956, 1957, 1961, 1963, 1969, 1972, 1974, 1984, 2003, 2023, 2024, 2026

The Morehead State Eagles are an NCAA Division I men's basketball team that represents Morehead State University in Morehead, Kentucky, United States. The school is a charter member of the Ohio Valley Conference and has competed in the OVC since its inception in 1948. Morehead State has appeared in the NCAA Division I men's basketball tournament nine times, most recently in 2024.

== Program summary ==
The Eagles are the lone charter member of the OVC that still currently competes in the conference. Morehead State has made nine NCAA tournament appearances, with the most recent coming during the 2023–24 season. MSU has won a total of 17 OVC championship, with 11 regular season titles and six OVC tournament championships. MSU's 17 OVC championships are the most won by any current OVC member, while the Eagles' six OVC tournament titles is also tops amongst the current set of OVC squads. The most recent OVC title came during the 2023–24 season, when the Eagles collected a share of the regular-season crown and won the 2024 OVC tournament. The Eagles were formerly coached by Preston Spradlin, who resigned after his eighth season at Morehead State. Spradlin guided the Eagles to four straight 20-win seasons for the first time in program history from 2020–24. Morehead State set a new program record for most wins in a season during the 2023–24 season, as the Eagles collected a total of 26 wins. Jonathan Mattox, previously associate head coach, was named as the 15th head coach in the program's history.

== Postseason results ==
=== NCAA Division I tournament results ===
The Eagles have appeared in nine NCAA Tournaments, with the most recent coming during the 2024 NCAA Tournament. Morehead State is a combined record is 6–10 in the NCAA Tournament. The six NCAA tournament wins are the most by any current Ohio Valley Conference member and are the second-most in OVC history, behind former member Western Kentucky. Additionally, MSU’s nine tournament appearances are third-most in OVC history.

Year	Seed	Round	Opponent	Result
1956		Quarterfinals; Semifinals; East Regional 3rd Place Game	Marshall; Iowa; Wayne State	W 107–92; L 83–97; W 95–84
1957		Quarterfinals	Pittsburgh	L 85–86
1961		Quarterfinals; Semifinals; Mideast Regional Third Place	Xavier; Kentucky; Louisville	W 71–66; L 64–71; L 61–83
1983	11	First Round	(6) Syracuse	L 59–74
1984	12	Preliminary Round; First Round	(12) North Carolina A&T (5) Louisville	W 70–69; L 59–72
2009	16	Opening Round; First Round	(16) Alabama State (1) Louisville	W 58–41; L 54–74
2011	13	First Round; Second Round	(4) Louisville (12) Richmond	W 62–61; L 48–65
2021	14	First Round	(3) West Virginia	L 67–84
2024	14	First Round	(3) Illinois	L 69–85

=== NIT results ===
The Eagles have appeared in the National Invitation Tournament one time. Their combined record is 1–1.

Year	Round	Opponent	Result
2023	First Round; Second Round	Clemson; UAB	W 68–64; L 59–77

=== CBI results ===
The Eagles have appeared in three College Basketball Invitational (CBI). Their combined record is 5–4.

Year	Round	Opponent	Result
2010	First Round; Quarterfinals	Colorado State; Boston University	W 74–60; L 89–91^{OT}
2014	First Round	Illinois State	L 67–77
2016	First Round; Quarterfinals; Semifinals; Finals–Game 1 Finals–Game 2 Finals–Game 3	Siena; Duquesne; Ohio; Nevada; Nevada; Nevada	W 84–80; W 82–72; W 77–72; W 86–83; L 68–77; L 82–85^{OT}

=== NAIA ===
The Eagles have appeared in the NAIA Basketball Tournament once, their record is 0–1.

Year	Round	Opponent	Result
1951	First Round	Southwest Texas State	L 70–62

== Eagles in the NBA ==
Morehead State has had a total of seven former Eagles play in an NBA game. Xavier Moon is the most recent Morehead State alum to play in the NBA. Moon is currently in his third season with the Los Angeles Clippers, playing on a two-way contract with the Clippers and the NBA G League’s Ontario Clippers, as of the 2023–24 season.

Kenneth Faried is Morehead State’s highest NBA Draft pick, as he is the school’s lone first round pick. Faried was selected as the No. 17 overall pick by the Denver Nuggets in the First Round of the 2011 NBA draft. He would go on to play the most NBA games by an Eagle, as he logged 478 career appearances over eight seasons with the Nuggets, Houston Rockets, and Brooklyn Nets from 2011–19. Faried scored 5,430 points and pulled down 3,884 rebounds in the NBA, both are the most by a Morehead State player.

List of Morehead State players that played in the NBA

- Xavier Moon (2021– Pres.)
- Kenneth Faried (2011–19)
- Bob McCann (1989–98)
- Lamar Green (1969–75)
- Henry Akin (1966–68)
- Steve Hamilton (1958–60)
- Dan Swartz (1962–63)

== Eagles in international leagues ==
- Demonte Harper (born 1989), basketball player in the Israeli Basketball Premier League
- Karam Mashour (born 1991), plays in the Israeli Basketball Premier League.
