= 2016 LFL US season =

2016 LFL United States
- Eastern Champions champions: Chicago Bliss
- Western Champions champions: Seattle Mist

Legends Cup
- Venue: Scottsdale, AZ
- Champions: Chicago Bliss

Seasons
- ← 2015 US 2017 US →

The 2016 LFL US season was the seventh season of the Legends Football League in the United States. The season featured eight teams from across the US in two four team conference. During the regular season each team played each other team in their conference once, and a single cross conference game. The top two teams from each conference then played a single elimination game to qualify for the Legends Cup final in Scottsdale, Arizona.

== Developments ==
The Las Vegas Sin did not participate in the 2016 LFL season, citing an inability to find a suitable home venue. Three teams joined the LFL, the Austin Acoustic, Dallas Desire, and New England Liberty. The Acoustic and Liberty were newcomers to the LFL while the Desire had played in Lingerie Bowls II and III and in the league between 2009 and 2012.

== Schedule ==
Date	Visitor	Home	Venue	Score
Regular Season
Saturday, April 9	Austin Acoustic	Seattle Mist	ShoWare Center	Seattle 44; Austin 8
Friday, April 15	New England Liberty	Omaha Heart	Ralston Arena	Omaha 26; New England 6
Sunday, April 24	Seattle Mist	Los Angeles Temptation	Citizens Business Bank Arena	Seattle 20; Los Angeles 12
Saturday, April 30	New England Liberty	Austin Acoustic	Cedar Park Center	Austin 42; New England 21
Saturday, May 7	Dallas Desire	Los Angeles Temptation	Citizens Business Bank Arena	Los Angeles 33; Dallas 32
Friday, May 13	Chicago Bliss	Seattle Mist	ShoWare Center	Seattle 40; Chicago 28
Saturday, May 21	Austin Acoustic	Dallas Desire	Dr Pepper Arena	Dallas 46; Austin 6
Friday, June 3	Omaha Heart	Atlanta Steam	Arena at Gwinnett Center	Atlanta 77; Omaha 0
Saturday, June 11	Los Angeles Temptation	Austin Acoustic	Cedar Park Center	Los Angeles 49; Austin 32
Saturday, June 18	Seattle Mist	Dallas Desire	Dr Pepper Arena	Dallas 26; Seattle 21
Friday, June 24	Chicago Bliss	New England Liberty	Verizon Wireless Arena	Chicago 70; New England 7
Saturday, July 2	Omaha Heart	Chicago Bliss	Toyota Park	Chicago 66; Omaha 0
Saturday, July 9	Los Angeles Temptation	Atlanta Steam	Arena at Gwinnett Center	Los Angeles 33; Atlanta 26
Saturday, July 23	Atlanta Steam	New England Liberty	Verizon Wireless Arena	Cancelled
Saturday, July 30	Dallas Desire	Omaha Heart	Ralston Arena	Dallas 87; Omaha 12
Saturday, August 6	Atlanta Steam	Chicago Bliss	Toyota Park	Chicago 39; Atlanta 32

== Playoffs ==
Date	Visitor	Home	Venue	City	Score
Conference Championships
Saturday, August 20	Atlanta Steam	Chicago Bliss	ShoWare Center	Kent, Washington	Chicago 30; Atlanta 25
Saturday, August 20	Dallas Desire	Seattle Mist	ShoWare Center	Kent, Washington	Seattle 44; Dallas 6
Legends Cup
Saturday, August 27	Chicago Bliss	Seattle Mist	WestWorld	Scottsdale, Arizona	Chicago 31; Seattle 26

== Standings ==
=== Eastern Conference ===
Team	Wins	Loss	Ties	Pct	PF	PA	Net Pts	TD's	Home Record	Home Pct	Road Record	Road Pct
Chicago Bliss	3	1	0	0.750	203	79	124	30	2-0	1.000	3-1	0.750
Atlanta Steam	1	2	1 ^{a}	0.250	135	72	43	20	1-1	.500	0-1	0.000
Omaha Heart	1	3	0	0.250	38	236	-198	6	1-1	0.500	0-2	0.000
New England Liberty	0	3	1 ^{a}	0.000	34	138	-104	5	0-1	0.000	0-2	0.000

=== Western Conference ===
Team	Wins	Loss	Ties	Pct	PF	PA	Net Pts	TD's	Home Record	Home Pct	Road Record	Road Pct
Dallas Desire	3	1	0	0.750	191	72	119	29	2-0	1.000	1-1	0.500
Seattle Mist	3	1	0	0.750	125	74	51	19	2-0	1.000	1-1	0.500
Los Angeles Temptation	3	1	0	0.750	127	110	17	19	1-1	0.500	2-0	1.000
Austin Acoustic	1	3	0	0.250	88	160	-72	13	1-1	0.500	0-2	0.000

== Playoffs ==
The Conference Championship games were held on Saturday, August 20 at the ShoWare Center in Kent, Washington. The hometown Seattle Mist won the Western Conference title, defeating the expansion Dallas Desire 44-6 in a rematch of an earlier game at Dallas in which the Desire prevailed. The Eastern Conference title game featured the Chicago Bliss versus the Atlanta Steam. Atlanta took a commanding 25-8 lead into the half but Chicago rallied, shutting out Atlanta in the second half to earn their fourth straight appearance in the Legends Cup with a 30-25 victory.

The 2016 Legends Cup was held on Saturday, August 27 at WestWorld in Scottsdale, Arizona between the defending champion Seattle Mist and the previous two-time champion Chicago Bliss, a rematch of an early season game which was won by the Mist. Seattle scored on the opening drive to take a 6-0 lead. Chicago tied the game but the Mist scored again to close the opening quarter and then once more to go up 18-6. As they did in the playoffs against Atlanta, Chicago rallied, closing the gap and taking the lead 19-18 just before the half. Chicago scored again near the end of the third period to extend their lead to 25-18. Seattle opened the fourth quarter with a score to retake the lead 26-25 but Chicago responded with a touchdown of their own. Chicago's defense then stopped Seattle and claimed the victory 31-26 to win their third Legends Cup championship in four years. Chicago quarterback Jacinda Barclay captured her first LFL championship in the United States, her second overall having won the title in the 2013-2014 inaugural season of LFL Australia.

Conference Championships; Saturday, August 20
E1	Chicago	30
E2	Atlanta	25
W1	Dallas	6
W2	Seattle	44

Legends Cup; Saturday, August 27
Chicago	31
Seattle	26

== Notes ==
1. New England was forced to forfeit their final game of the season, due to being unable to field a team.
