= 2017 LFL US season =

2017 LFL United States
- Duration: 14 April 2017 – 5 August 2017
- Eastern Champions champions: Atlanta Steam
- Western Champions champions: Seattle Mist

Legends Cup
- Date: 3 September 2017
- Venue: Citizens Business Bank Arena, Ontario, California
- Champions: Seattle Mist

Seasons
- 2016 US 2018 US

The 2017 LFL US season is the eighth season of the Legends Football League (LFL) in the United States. It began 14 April 2017, and concluded 5 August 2017.

== Developments ==
In January 2017 the LFL announced that it had signed a multi-year contract with Candle and Caleb to provide new uniforms for the league, including alternative uniforms with pants.

In February Super Channel announced that it had signed a three-year deal to broadcast the LFL in Canada.

== Standings ==
No ties occurred this season.

=== Eastern Conference ===
Team	W	L	Pct	PF	PA	Net Pts	TD's	Home Record	Home Pct	Road Record	Road Pct	GB
x-Chicago Bliss	4	0	1.000	253	33	220	39	2–0	1.000	2–0	1.000	-
y-Atlanta Steam	2	2	.500	164	106	58	26	1-1	.500	1-1	.500	2
Omaha Heart	1	3	.250	60	166	-106	9	1-1	.500	0–2	.000	3
Pittsburgh Rebellion	1	3	.250	56	144	-88	9	1-1	.500	0–2	.000	3

=== Western Conference ===
Team	W	L	Pct	PF	PA	Net Pts	TD's	Home Record	Home Pct	Road Record	Road Pct	GB
x-Seattle Mist	4	0	1.000	312	32	280	50	2–0	1.000	2–0	1.000	-
y-Los Angeles Temptation	4	0	1.000	189	54	135	30	2–0	1.000	2–0	1.000	-
Austin Acoustic	0	4	.000	91	231	-140	14	0-2	.000	0-2	.000	4
Denver Dream	0	4	.000	6	363	-357	1	0-2	.000	0-2	.000	4

x - clinched conference title
y - clinched playoff berth

== Season schedule ==
Date	Visitor	Home	Kickoff	Venue	Score
Regular Season
Saturday, April 15	Seattle Mist	Austin Acoustic	8:00 PM CT	Cedar Park Center	Seattle 46, Austin 26
Friday, April 21	Pittsburgh Rebellion	Omaha Heart	8:00 PM CT	Ralston Arena	Omaha 34, Pittsburgh 6
Saturday, April 29	Chicago Bliss	Denver Dream	7:00 PM MT	Budweiser Events Center	Chicago 93, Denver 6
Saturday, May 6	Atlanta Steam	Pittsburgh Rebellion	7:00 PM ET	Highmark Stadium	Atlanta 56, Pittsburgh 21
Friday, May 12	Omaha Heart	Los Angeles Temptation	8:00 PM PT	Citizens Business Bank Arena	Los Angeles 79, Omaha 6
Saturday, May 20	Denver Dream	Seattle Mist	7:00 PM PT	ShoWare Center	Seattle 106, Denver 0
Saturday, May 27	BYE WEEK				
Saturday, June 3	Atlanta Steam	Chicago Bliss	7:00 PM CT	Toyota Park	Chicago 34, Atlanta 27
Saturday, June 10	Omaha Heart	Pittsburgh Rebellion	7:00 PM ET	Highmark Stadium	Pittsburgh 21, Omaha 20
Saturday, June 17	Austin Acoustic	Atlanta Steam	7:00 PM ET	Infinite Energy Arena	Atlanta 67, Austin 31
Saturday, June 24	Los Angeles Temptation	Austin Acoustic	7:00 PM CT	Cedar Park Center	Los Angeles 56, Austin 28
Saturday, July 1	Seattle Mist	Denver Dream	7:00 PM MT	Budweiser Events Center	Seattle 98, Denver 0
Saturday, July 8	Pittsburgh Rebellion	Los Angeles Temptation	7:00 PM PT	Citizens Business Bank Arena	Los Angeles 34, Pittsburgh 6
Saturday, July 15	Austin Acoustic	Seattle Mist	7:00 PM PT	ShoWare Center	Seattle 62, Austin 6
Saturday, July 22	Chicago Bliss	Omaha Heart	8:00 PM	Ralston Arena	Chicago 60, Omaha 0
Saturday, July 29	Denver Dream	Chicago Bliss	7:00 PM CT	Toyota Park	Chicago 66, Denver 0
Saturday, August 5	Los Angeles Temptation	Atlanta Steam	7:00 PM ET	Infinite Energy Arena	Los Angeles 20, Atlanta 14
Saturday, August 12	BYE WEEK				

== Playoffs ==
Conference Championships were played on 20 August 2017 at Sears Centre Arena in Hoffman Estates, Illinois. The Seattle Mist defeated the Los Angeles Temptation 28–13 to win the Western Conference title and advance to their third straight Legends Cup appearance. In the Eastern Conference, the Atlanta Steam got their first victory over the defending champion Chicago Bliss in a 14–6 upset to win the title and make their second appearance in the championship game.

The 2017 Legends Cup was held on 3 September 2017 at Citizens Business Bank Arena in Ontario, California. The lead swung back and forth throughout the game with Seattle scoring early, Atlanta taking the lead, and Seattle retaking it 18-14 again before the half. The score see-sawed in the second half as well before Seattle pulled away in the fourth quarter to win their second Legends Cup title in three years with a 38–28 victory. Seattle running back Stevi Schnoor was named MVP of the game.

Conference Championships
E1	Chicago Bliss	6
E2	Atlanta Steam	14
W1	Seattle Mist	28
W2	Los Angeles Temptation	13

Legends Cup
Atlanta Steam	28
Seattle Mist	38
