= 2018 LFL US season =

2018 LFL United States
- Duration: 14 April 2018 – 11 August 2018
- Eastern Champions champions: Chicago Bliss
- Western Champions champions: Austin Acoustic

Legends Cup
- Date: 8 September 2018
- Venue: H-E-B Center, Cedar Park, Texas
- Champions: Chicago Bliss

Seasons
- ← 2017 US 2019 US →

The 2018 LFL US Season is the ninth season of the Legends Football League (LFL) in the United States. It began on 14 April 2018, and ended on 11 August.

The Chicago Bliss beat the Austin Acoustic 28–20 in the Legends Cup to win their fourth title, finishing with a perfect 6–0 season.

== Developments ==
In November 2017, it was announced that the Nashville Knights would join the LFL, and begin its inaugural season in the league for the 2018 season, with former Seattle Mist tight end Danika Brace named as the Knights’ head coach. The Pittsburgh Rebellion did not compete in the 2018 season while they conducted a search for a new home venue. They were expected to rejoin the LFL in 2019 but did not.

Nashville's recruitment also resulted in a rule change concerning free agency. Nashville recruited seven of the starters from defending champion Seattle, essentially transplanting the Mist's lineup to a new team nearly intact. This move prompted the league to institute a rule only allowing five free agents per team. As a result of this rule change, Nashville was forced to turn away two of their free agency recruits who returned to Seattle. Nashville courted further controversy when Seattle's former coach, who had retired in the off-season, reappeared as the offensive coordinator of the Knights.

The LFL partnered with Planet Sport to broadcast LFL games in eastern Europe. The partnership allows Planet Sport to broadcast LFL games and ancillary programming from July 2018 through August 2021.

In January 2018, the LFL announced individual and/or group ownership of existing and future franchises beginning with the 2018 season, continuing to build out the LFL US league, while also developing planned strategies for the revivals of LFL Canada and LFL Australia, as well as to start a new European league in the future.

The 2018 season also saw a major uniform change. The players' uniforms now featured leggings instead of shorts. While the league, players, and many fans saw this as a good change there was a vocal segment of the fan base, as well as a group of players, that objected to the leggings. As a result of the outcry, the LFL changed to shorts, consisting of the same patterns as the pants and 2-3 inches longer than the original bikini brief, for the remainder of the season.

== Teams ==
=== Eastern Conference ===
| Team | Arena | Location |
|---|---|---|
| Atlanta Steam | Infinite Energy Arena | Duluth, Georgia |
| Chicago Bliss | Sears Centre | Hoffman Estates, Illinois |
| Nashville Knights | Nashville Municipal Auditorium | Nashville, Tennessee |
| Omaha Heart | Ralston Arena | Ralston, Nebraska |

=== Western Conference ===
| Team | Arena | Location |
|---|---|---|
| Austin Acoustic | H-E-B Center | Cedar Park, Texas |
| Denver Dream | Budweiser Events Center | Loveland, Colorado |
| Los Angeles Temptation | Citizens Business Bank Arena | Ontario, California |
| Seattle Mist | ShoWare Center | Kent, Washington |

== Schedule ==
| Date | Visitor | Home | Venue | Score |
|---|---|---|---|---|
Regular season
| Saturday, April 14 | Los Angeles Temptation | Chicago Bliss | Sears Centre | Chicago 28; Los Angeles 6 |
| Saturday, April 21 | Austin Acoustic | Nashville Knights | Nashville Municipal Auditorium | Nashville 51; Austin 26 |
| Friday, April 27 | Omaha Heart | Denver Dream | Budweiser Events Center | Omaha 7 Denver 6 |
| Saturday, May 5 | Atlanta Steam | Austin Acoustic | H-E-B Center | Austin 18; Atlanta 14 |
| Friday, May 11 | Chicago Bliss | Los Angeles Temptation | Citizens Business Bank Arena | Chicago 34; Los Angeles 18 |
| Saturday, May 19 | Nashville Knights | Seattle Mist | ShoWare Center | Nashville 43; Seattle 24 |
| Saturday, June 9 | Austin Acoustic | Los Angeles Temptation | Citizens Business Bank Arena | Austin 16; Los Angeles 14 |
| Saturday, June 16 | Seattle Mist | Atlanta Steam | Infinite Energy Arena | Atlanta 44; Seattle 42 |
| Saturday, June 23 | Denver Dream | Nashville Knights | Nashville Municipal Auditorium | Nashville 94; Denver 20 |
| Saturday, June 30 | Los Angeles Temptation | Denver Dream | Budweiser Events Center | Los Angeles 44; Denver 7 |
| Friday, July 7 | Nashville Knights | Omaha Heart | Ralston Arena | Nashville 80; Omaha 0 |
| Saturday, July 14 | Chicago Bliss | Atlanta Steam | Infinite Energy Arena | Chicago 52; Atlanta 34 |
| Saturday, July 21 | Seattle Mist | Austin Acoustic | H-E-B Center | Seattle 41; Austin 26 |
| Saturday, July 28 | Atlanta Steam | Seattle Mist | ShoWare Center | Atlanta 40; Seattle 18 |
| Saturday, August 4 | Denver Dream | Omaha Heart | Budweiser Events Center | Omaha 26; Denver 21 |
| Saturday, August 11 | Omaha Heart | Chicago Bliss | Sears Centre | Chicago 76; Omaha 0 |

== Playoffs ==
| Date | Visitor | Home | Venue | City | Score |
|---|---|---|---|---|---|
Conference Championships
| Saturday, August 25 | Los Angeles Temptation | Austin Acoustic | Toyota Park | Bridgeview, Illinois | Austin 32; Los Angeles 30 |
| Saturday, August 25 | Chicago Bliss | Nashville Knights | Toyota Park | Bridgeview, Illinois | Chicago 18; Nashville 6 |
Legends Cup
| Saturday, September 8 | Austin Acoustic | Chicago Bliss | H-E-B Center | Cedar Park, Texas | Chicago 28; Austin 20 |

== Standings ==
=== Eastern Conference ===
| Team | W | L | Pct | PF | PA | Net Pts | TD's | Home Record | Home Pct | Road Record | Road Pct | GB |
|---|---|---|---|---|---|---|---|---|---|---|---|---|
| x-Nashville Knights | 4 | 0 | 1.000 | 268 | 70 | 198 | 42 | 2-0 | 1.000 | 2-0 | 1.000 | - |
| y-Chicago Bliss | 4 | 0 | 1.000 | 187 | 58 | 129 | 29 | 2-0 | 1.000 | 2-0 | 1.000 | - |
| Atlanta Steam | 2 | 2 | .500 | 132 | 127 | 5 | 19 | 1-1 | .500 | 1-1 | .500 | 2 |
| Omaha Heart | 2 | 2 | .500 | 33 | 183 | -150 | 6 | 1-1 | .500 | 1-1 | .500 | 2 |

=== Western Conference ===
| Team | W | L | Pct | PF | PA | Net Pts | TD's | Home Record | Home Pct | Road Record | Road Pct | GB |
|---|---|---|---|---|---|---|---|---|---|---|---|---|
| x-Austin Acoustic | 2 | 2 | .500 | 86 | 108 | -22 | 14 | 1-1 | .500 | 1-1 | .500 | - |
| y-Los Angeles Temptation | 1 | 3 | .250 | 82 | 85 | -3 | 13 | 0-2 | .000 | 1-1 | .500 | 1 |
| Seattle Mist | 1 | 3 | .250 | 125 | 153 | -28 | 19 | 0-2 | .000 | 1-1 | .500 | 1 |
| Denver Dream | 0 | 4 | .000 | 54 | 171 | -117 | 9 | 0-2 | .000 | 0-2 | .000 | 2 |

x - clinched conference title
y - clinched playoff berth

== Playoffs ==
Conference Championships were played on August 25, 2018 at Toyota Park in the Chicago suburb of Bridgeview, Illinois. The season concluded with the Legends Cup, played on September 8, 2018, at the H-E-B Center in Cedar Park, Texas.

The Los Angeles Temptation were the first team in LFL history to qualify for the playoffs with a losing record but only if the 2016 Atlanta team is considered to have finished 2-2 courtesy of a New England forfeit instead of the 1-2-1 record that a lack of a contest would create.

In their first playoff appearance, the Austin Acoustic defeated Los Angeles 32-30 to advance to their first Legends Cup. Hours later, the Chicago Bliss defeated the Nashville Knights 18-6 to secure their sixth trip to the Legends Cup.

The Legends Cup featured Chicago as heavy favorites. The Bliss scored twice in the second quarter and led 12-0 at the half. Austin scored in the third quarter to cut the lead to 12-8 before Chicago added two more scores to extend their lead to 28-8. As the game wound down, Austin rallied with two touchdowns of their own leaving the final score 28-20. With the win, Chicago became the first team in the LFL to win forty games (a cumulative 40-10-1 record) and four championships (2013, 2014, 2016, and 2018). Chicago running back Javell Thompson, who scored three of the Bliss' four touchdowns, was named MVP of the Legends Cup.

Conference Championships; Saturday, August 25
E1 | Nashville | 6
E2 | Chicago | 18
W1 | Austin | 32
W2 | Los Angeles | 30

Legends Cup; Saturday, September 8
Chicago | 28
Austin | 20
