= 2019 LFL US season =

2019 LFL United States
- Duration: April 5, 2019 – August 10, 2019

Legends Cup
- Date: September 7, 2019
- Venue: Accesso ShoWare Center, Kent, Washington
- Champions: Seattle Mist

Seasons
- 2018 US 2022 X League

The 2019 LFL US season was the 10th and final season of the Legends Football League (LFL) in the United States. It began April 5 and concluded on August 10.

== Developments ==
Shortly after the 2018 season ended, the LFL originally elected to hold the 2019 Legends Cup in South Africa's capital city of Johannesburg at Ellis Park Arena. However, this never took place.

In November 2018, defending champion Chicago Bliss head coach Keith Hac and his entire coaching staff resigned in protest of league policies and decisions. Three weeks later the league hired Danville coach JaDae Maguire as a replacement. Maguire did not mesh well with the Bliss and his tenure was short before a new coach, Sidney Lewis, was brought in. In addition to retirements at the end of the previous season, Chicago saw an exodus of many remaining players leaving them with only four returning starters. Chicago would finish the season 0–4, their worst record ever and only their second losing record, and failed to make the playoffs for only the second time ever.

On December 21, 2018, Chris Michaelson, who previously served as the head coach of the Seattle Mist, returned to that franchise as head coach once again. He spent the 2018 season serving as offensive coordinator of the upstart Nashville Knights. For the purpose of rebuilding the Mist franchise to its previous form, Michaelson replaced interim coach Eric Bellamy, who had been named the Mist's interim coach for 2018 after Michelson's supposed retirement in the off-season following a Legends Cup-winning season in 2017. Michaelson previously served as the Mist head coach from 2009 to 2017, leading that franchise to two Legends Cup championship titles.

In early 2019, the LFL announced a new broadcast partner in Honduran television network TDTV.

On June 19, 2019, the league announced a change in the playoff format. Instead of the two best teams from each conference playing for their respective conference titles, the league would abandon the conference titles and pit the top four teams with the best records in an elimination tournament. The team with the best record would play the team with the fourth best record while the teams with the second and third best records would play one another. The immediate effect of this change mid-season was to scramble the playoff standings; Chicago was immediately statistically eliminated, Omaha, which had needed only a victory over winless Denver, suddenly needed to also defeat Atlanta, and Los Angeles could still make the playoffs if Austin beat Nashville in the regular season finale.

== Teams ==
=== Eastern Conference ===
Team	Arena	City
Atlanta Steam	Infinite Energy Arena	Duluth, Georgia
Chicago Bliss	Sears Centre	Hoffman Estates, Illinois
Nashville Knights	Nashville Municipal Auditorium	Nashville, Tennessee
Omaha Heart	Ralston Arena	Ralston, Nebraska

=== Western Conference ===
Team	Arena	City
Austin Acoustic	H-E-B Center	Cedar Park, Texas
Denver Dream	Budweiser Events Center	Loveland, Colorado
Los Angeles Temptation	Toyota Arena	Ontario, California
Seattle Mist	Accesso ShoWare Center	Kent, Washington

LFL Pro Bowl Eastern Western

== Schedule ==
=== Regular season ===
Date	Visitor	Home	Venue	Score	Reference
Friday, April 5, 2019	Seattle Mist	Los Angeles Temptation	Citizens Business Bank Arena	Seattle 34; Los Angeles 19	
Saturday, April 20	Atlanta Steam	Chicago Bliss	Sears Centre Arena	Atlanta 30; Chicago 8	
Friday, April 26	Los Angeles Temptation	Denver Dream	Budweiser Event Center	Los Angeles 47; Denver 18	
Saturday, May 4	Chicago Bliss	Austin Acoustic	H-E-B Center	Austin 38; Chicago 8	
Saturday, May 11	Omaha Heart	Seattle Mist	Accesso ShoWare Center	Omaha 6 Seattle 70	
Friday, May 17	Atlanta Steam	Los Angeles Temptation	Citizens Business Bank Arena	Atlanta 33; L.A. 34	
Saturday, June 1	Nashville Knights	Omaha Heart	Ralston Arena	Nashville 25; Omaha 49	
Saturday, June 8	Seattle Mist	Denver Dream	Budweiser Event Center	Seattle 62; Denver 22	
Saturday, June 15	Chicago Bliss	Atlanta Steam	Infinite Energy Arena	Chicago 25; Atlanta 30	
Saturday, June 22	Denver Dream	Nashville Knights	Nashville Municipal Auditorium	Denver 12; Nashville 14	
Saturday, June 29	Austin Acoustic	Seattle Mist	Accesso ShoWare Center	Austin 36; Seattle 34	
Saturday, July 13	Denver Dream	Omaha Heart	Ralston Arena	Denver 13; Omaha 32	
Saturday, July 20	Nashville Knights	Chicago Bliss	Sears Centre Arena	Nashville 8 Chicago 6	
Saturday, July 27	Los Angeles Temptation	Austin Acoustic	H-E-B Center	Los Angeles 26; Austin 33	
Saturday, August 3	Omaha Heart	Atlanta Steam	Infinite Energy Arena	Omaha 14; Atlanta 50	
Saturday, August 10	Austin Acoustic	Nashville Knights	Nashville Municipal Auditorium	Austin 20; Nashville 18	

=== Postseason ===
Date	Visitor	Home	Venue	Score
Playoff Semi-Finals
Saturday, August 24	Los Angeles Temptation	Austin Acoustic	Toyota Arena, Ontario, California	Los Angeles 39 Austin 29
Saturday, August 24	Atlanta Steam	Seattle Mist	Toyota Arena, Ontario, California	Seattle 38 Atlanta 14
Legends Cup 2019
Saturday, September 7	Los Angeles Temptation	Seattle Mist	Accesso ShoWare Center, Kent, Washington	Seattle 56 Los Angeles 20

=== Showcase Game ===
Date	Visitor	Home	Venue	Score
Saturday, November 16	Los Angeles Temptation	Austin Acoustic	Mexico City Arena, Azcapotzalco, Mexico City, Mexico	Cancelled

== Standings ==
Team	W	L	Pct	PF	PA	Net Pts	TD's	Home Record	Home Pct	Road Record	Road Pct	GB
x-Austin Acoustic	4	0	1.000	127	86	41	19	2–0	1.000	2–0	1.000	–
x-Seattle Mist	3	1	.750	200	83	117	32	1–1	.500	2–0	1.000	1
x-Atlanta Steam	3	1	.750	143	81	62	20	2–0	1.000	1–1	.500	1
x-Los Angeles Temptation	2	2	.500	126	119	7	19	1–1	.500	1–1	.500	2
Omaha Heart	2	2	.500	101	158	-57 ^{a}	14	2–0	1.000	0–2	.000	2
Nashville Knights	2	2	.500	65	87	-22 ^{a}	10	1–1	.500	1–1	.500	2
Chicago Bliss	0	4	.000	47	106	-59	7	0–2	.000	0–2	.000	4
Denver Dream	0	4	.000	65	154	-89	10	0–2	.000	0–2	.000	4

x - clinched playoff berth

== Playoffs ==
Semifinals were played on August 24, 2019, at Toyota Arena in Ontario, California. Legends Cup 2019 was played on September 7, 2019, at the Accesso ShoWare Center in Kent, Washington, instead of South Africa as originally planned. In the 2018 State of the League address delivered by Commissioner Mitchell Mortaza, the 2020 Legends Cup was expected to be the first of upcoming Legends Cups to be played abroad in international destinations; however, that was scrapped when the league decided not to hold its next season. The schedule on LFLUS.com was updated on June 19, 2019, to show the Legends Cup had been moved. On the same day, the league announced the playoff format would change, with the conference championship title removed. Instead, the top teams from both conference would be ranked 1–4, with 1st facing 4th and 2nd facing 3rd.

Semifinals
Seed 1	Austin	29
Seed 4	Los Angeles	39
Seed 2	Seattle	38
Seed 3	Atlanta	14

Legends Cup
Los Angeles	20
Seattle	56

== Awards ==
League MVP

- Amber Clark - Atlanta Steam
- Miriah Lopez - Los Angeles Temptation
- Jade Randle - Seattle Mist
- Stevi Schnoor - Seattle Mist

Offensive Player of the Year

- Kassandra Bills - Austin Acoustic
- ChrisDell Harris - Austin Acoustic
- Miriah Lopez - Los Angeles Temptation
- Stevi Schnoor - Seattle Mist

Team of the Year

- Austin Acoustic
- Omaha Heart
- Nashville Knights
- Seattle Mist

Defensive Player of the Year

- Alli Alberts - Seattle Mist
- Amber Clark - Atlanta Steam
- Britney Dowdy - Austic Acoustic
- Jade Randle - Seattle Mist

Coach of the Year

- Dontae Allen / Cale Good - Omaha Heart
- Yuri Howard - Nashville Knights
- Chris Michaelson - Seattle Mist
- Mike Olvera - Austin Acoustic

Coaching Staff of the Year

- Atlanta Steam
- Austin Acoustic
- Nashville Knights
- Seattle Mist

In The Trenches (Line)

- Lindsey Burse - Omaha Heart
- Britney Dowdy - Austic Acoustic
- Lauren Jay - Omaha Heart
- Dina Wojowski - Atlanta Steam

Rookie of the Year

- Lauren Crouch - Omaha Heart
- Nicole Hulce - Atlanta Steam
- Bre Mosley - Nashville Knights
- Emma Vanderheyden - Chicago Bliss

Mortaza Award

- Jessica Bateman - Austin Acoustic
- Lindsi Cash - Los Angeles Temptation
- Nicole Curry - Denver Dream
- Austina Mellberg - Nashville Knights

True 8th Man Award

- Jessica Bateman - Austin Acoustic
- Mike McGhee - Seattle Mist
- Jessica Robinson - Atlanta Steam

2015 LFL Hall of Fame Induction - Danika Brace

== Notes ==
1. Omaha finished ahead of Nashville in the standings as a result of their 49-25 head-to-head victory on June 1, 2019.
