= Denver Dream (football) =

Women's American football team

Logo

General information
- Founded: 2009–10
- Folded: 2019
- Stadium: Budweiser Events Center
- Headquartered: Denver, Colorado, United States
- Website: www.lflus.com/denverdream/

Personnel
- Owners: Lingerie Football League, LLC
- Head coach: Adam Johnson

League / conference affiliations
- Legends Football League; Western Conference

The Denver Dream were a women's American football team that played in the Legends Football League (LFL), with home games at the Budweiser Events Center in Loveland, Colorado. The team first competed during the league's 2009–10 season, were inactive from 2011 through 2016, the played during the 2017 through 2019 seasons. During the 2009–10 season, the league was known as the Lingerie Football League and the team was based in Commerce City, Colorado.

Following the 2019 season, the LFL ceased operations and relaunched as the Extreme Football League (X League), which first played in 2022. All former LFL teams received new brands and the Dream were replaced by the Denver Rush.

== History ==
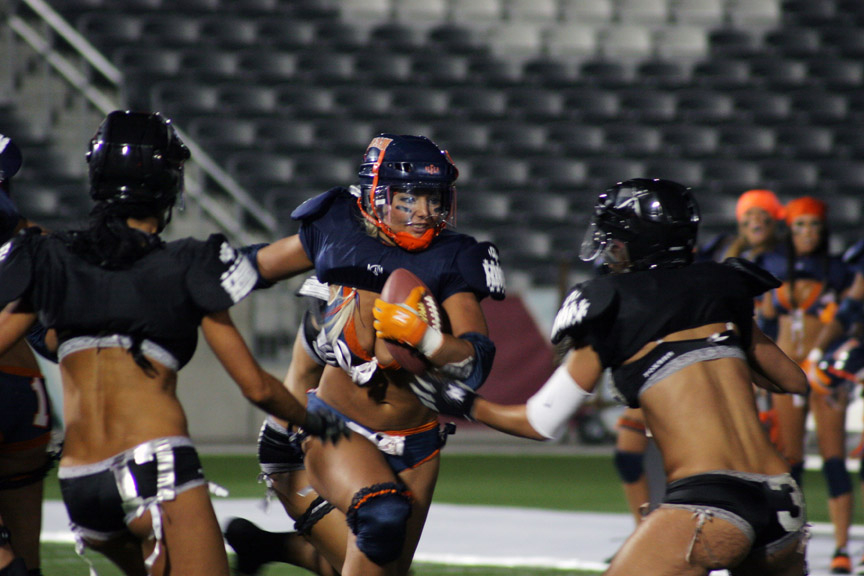
Denver Dream player in action against the L.A. Temptation

The Dream started as a 2009 expansion team in the inaugural season of the Lingerie Football League (LFL). The new league had a fall and winter schedule in order to keep the championship game, the Lingerie Bowl, as an alternative Super halftime event. The Dream were led by head coach Allen Watkins and assisted by former Denver Broncos wide receiver Mark Jackson. They played two dates at their home field, Dick's Sporting Goods Park in Commerce City, Colorado, one of two teams along with the Dallas Desire to have home games in an outdoor stadium, and one of the few short-field football teams to have done so. They went winless in its first season. League commissioner Mitchell Mortaza suspended the team's operations after the 2009 season, at the same time as the struggling New York Majesty, to keep the league at an even number of teams; it was implied that the league would be unable or unwilling to reach a deal to continue playing at Dick's Sporting Goods Park.

In May 2013, the league, now rebranded as the Legends Football League, reached an agreement to play 2013 playoff games in 1stBank Center in Broomfield, Colorado, and hinted at the possible return of the Denver Dream. The Dream were added back to the league for the 2017 season, with home games at the Budweiser Events Center in Loveland, Colorado. The 2017 Denver Dream were led by head coach Carlos Bates and assisted by Jason Jines and Mitchell Shipley.

The Dream played for three more winless seasons from 2017 to 2019 before the LFL was rebranded again as the X League. When the X League launched, it instead had a team called the Denver Rush with an announced home as the Denver Coliseum.

== Season schedules ==
=== 2009–10 ===
Date	Opponent	Location	Result	Record
September 18, 2009	Los Angeles Temptation	Dick's Sporting Goods Park	Lost, 20–26	0–1
September 25, 2009	at Dallas Desire	QuikTrip Park	Lost, 6–20	0–2
October 9, 2009	Seattle Mist	Dick's Sporting Goods Park	Lost, 19–28	0–3
January 8, 2010	at San Diego Seduction	San Diego Sports Arena	Cancelled	0–3

=== 2017 ===
Date	Opponent	Location	Result	Record
April 29	Chicago Bliss	Budweiser Events Center	Lost, 6–93	0–1
May 20	at Seattle Mist	ShoWare Center	Lost, 0–106	0–2
July 1	Seattle Mist	Budweiser Events Center	Lost, 0–101	0–3
July 29	at Chicago Bliss	Toyota Park	Lost, 0–66	0–4

=== 2018 ===
Date	Opponent	Location	Result	Record
April 27	Omaha Heart	Budweiser Events Center	Lost, 6–7	0–1
June 23	at Nashville Knights	Nashville Municipal Auditorium	Lost, 20–94	0–2
June 30	Los Angeles Temptation	Budweiser Events Center	Lost, 7–44	0–3
August 4	at Omaha Heart	Ralston Arena	Lost, 21–26	0–4

=== 2019 ===
Date	Opponent	Location	Result	Record
April 26	Los Angeles Temptation	Budweiser Events Center	Lost, 18–47	0–1
June 8	Seattle Mist	Budweiser Events Center	Lost, 22–62	0–2
June 22	at Nashville Knights	Nashville Municipal Auditorium	Lost, 12–14	0–3
July 13	at Omaha Heart	Ralston Arena	Lost, 13–32	0–4

== Anthem ==
Blue Dog And Sponge Cake, a band from Aurora, Colorado, created an anthem for the Denver Dream.
