= Dallas Desire =

Professional women's American football team

Logo

General information
- Founded: 2004
- Folded: 2016
- Stadium: QuikTrip Park; Cotton Bowl; Dr Pepper Arena
- Headquartered: Dallas–Fort Worth metroplex
- Colors: Blue, silver, and white
- Website: www.lflus.com/dallasdesire/

Personnel
- Owners: Lingerie Football League, LLC

League / conference affiliations
- Legends Football League; Western Conference

The Dallas Desire was a professional women's American football team located in the Dallas–Fort Worth metroplex. While active, they were one of five teams of the Lingerie Football League's Western Division. The Desire was one of two new teams added in 2004, along with the Chicago Bliss, before the second Lingerie Bowl in 2005. Before the 2011–2012 season, the team was suspended and brought back for the 2016 season.

The original team played outdoors at the QuikTrip Park at Grand Prairie in 2009 and then one game at the Cotton Bowl in Dallas in 2010. In both seasons, the Dallas Desire were one of two LFL teams to play their home games on an outdoor stadium with the others being the Denver Dream in 2009 and the Miami Caliente in 2010. The relaunched team played indoors at Dr Pepper Arena in nearby Frisco. Team operations were suspended once again after the conclusion of the 2016 season.

== History ==
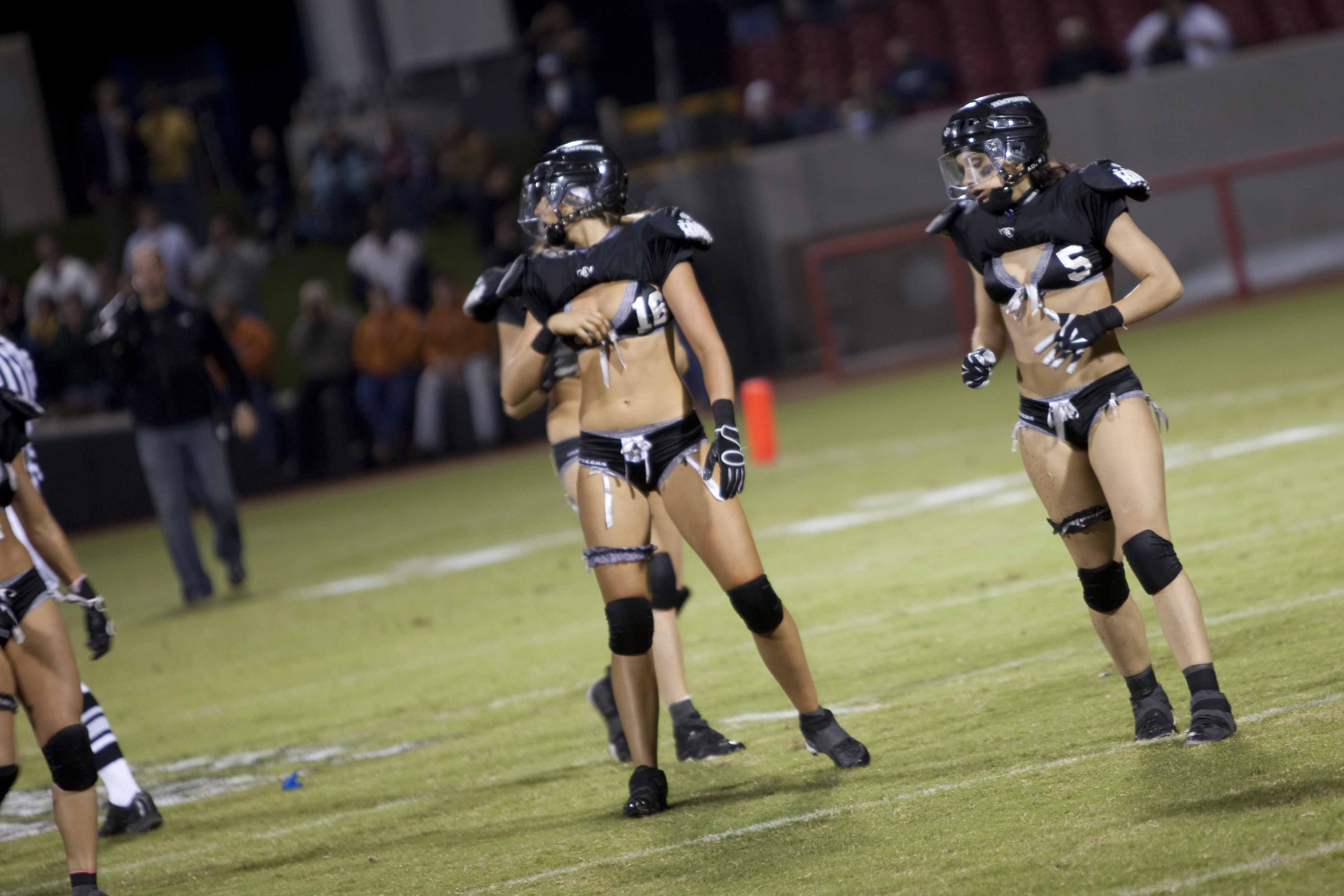
Desire players in a match against San Diego Seduction in October 2009.

After the first Lingerie Bowl in 2004 between Team Dream and Team Euphoria, the alternative Super halftime event expanded to a four team tournament. The Desire were announced as one of the two new teams alongside the Chicago Bliss added to the rebranded Los Angeles Temptation (formerly Team Dream) and New York Euphoria. While the teams had location based names, all practices and the event itself took place in Los Angeles. The Desire made their first appearance taking part in Lingerie Bowl II in 2005 coached by William "The Refrigerator" Perry. They were defeated by the Temptation in the Western Final, which included a Skill Test, a 3-on-2 match, and a dance competition, with a score of 36–68. They also took part in Lingerie Bowl III in 2006, also losing to the Temptation in the semifinal. The Lingerie Bowls from 2007 through 2009 were all cancelled for various reasons. The Lingerie Bowl then launched the Lingerie Football League (LFL), a full season league with home arenas and ten teams in two divisions. The Lingerie Bowl became the championship game for the league and was still scheduled during the Super Bowl halftime in February 2010.

For the 2009–10 LFL season, each team was scheduled to play the other four teams in its division once. Two of the games were at home and two were on the road. The Desire played its home games at QuikTrip Park in Grand Prairie, Texas, one of two teams that season to play outdoors. Their head coach was former NFL player Antuan Edwards. The Desire's first home game was on September 25, 2009, against the Denver Dream. Their other home game was against the Los Angeles Temptation while they played the San Diego Seduction and Seattle Mist on the road. They ended the regular season 3–1, qualifying for the Western Conference championship game, where they lost to the Los Angeles Temptation 20–14.

The 2010–11 LFL season had the same format as the previous season, but the Desire moved to the Cotton Bowl in Dallas, Texas, the highest-capacity stadium (92,100 seats) for any professional American football team, for their home games. All of the season's games were aired on MTV2. Dallas went 0–3 in the season before the league announced in early December 2010 that their last home game on January 21, 2011, against the Seattle Mist was cancelled due to the potential of inclement weather in the outdoor stadium and neither team winning a game.

On March 17, 2011, the LFL announced that the Dallas Desire franchise would be suspended for the 2011–12 season with a planned return in 2012–13, citing financial issues and the commitment of players, both on and off the field. In January 2012, assistant coach of Dallas Desire, Clarence LeBlanc released an announcement to the players that "Dallas Desire would be discontinued as a team but are looking to relocate to Austin, Texas." The league then cancelled the 2012–13 season, rebranded as the Legends Football League, and shifted to a summer and fall schedule away from the Super Bowl for the 2013 season.

In 2015, the LFL announced that the Dallas Desire would return for the 2016 season, playing at the Dr Pepper Arena in Frisco. The reinstatement of the franchise coincided with the arrival of a new franchise in Austin, the Austin Acoustic, which would be featured in a "Battle for Texas Bowl" and the Desire's first home game in the 2016 season. Former Texas A&M linebacker Melvin Bullitt was named head coach, with his brother Terrance as assistant. The 2016 Desire went 3–1 and lost the Western Conference championship to the Seattle Mist 44–6

The Desire ceased operations again before the 2017 season.

== Season schedules ==
Logo used from 2004 to 2008

=== 2009–10 ===
Date	Opponent	Venue	Score
September 25, 2009	Denver Dream	QuikTrip Park	Dallas 20; Denver 6
October 16, 2009	at San Diego Seduction	San Diego Sports Arena	Dallas 40; San Diego 6
October 23, 2009	Los Angeles Temptation	QuikTrip Park	Dallas 24; Los Angeles 12
January 1, 2010	at Seattle Mist	ShoWare Center	Seattle 28; Dallas 12
February 4, 2010; Western Conf. Championship	Los Angeles Temptation	Seminole Hard Rock	Los Angeles 20; Dallas 14

=== 2010–11 season ===
Date	Opponent	Venue	Score
September 3, 2010	San Diego Seduction	Cotton Bowl	San Diego 24; Dallas 13
September 10, 2010	at Chicago Bliss	Sears Centre	Dallas 7 Chicago 14
December 3, 2010	at Los Angeles Temptation	Los Angeles Memorial Coliseum	Dallas 6 Los Angeles 40
January 21, 2011	Seattle Mist	Cotton Bowl	Cancelled
