= Seattle Mist =

Women's American football team

Logo

General information
- Founded: 2009
- Folded: 2019
- Stadium: Accesso ShoWare Center
- Headquartered: Kent, Washington
- Colors: Seahawks Blue, Cambridge Blue, lime green and white
- Website: www.lflus.com/seattlemist/

Personnel
- Owners: Legends Football League, LLC
- Head coach: Chris Michaelson

League / conference affiliations
- Legends Football League; Western Conference

Championships
- Legends Cup wins: 3 (2015, 2017, 2019)
- Division championships: 3 (2013, 2015, 2017)

The Seattle Mist were a team in the Legends Football League that were founded as part of the Lingerie Bowl's expansion into a full-fledged league in 2009. They played their home games at the ShoWare Center in Kent, Washington. The league, originally named the Lingerie Football League, rebranded in 2013 and shifted away from Super Bowl halftime shows. The Mist won three championships, known as the Legends Cup.

Following the 2019 season, the LFL ceased operations and relaunched as the Extreme Football League (X League), which first played in 2022. All former LFL teams received new brands and the Mist were replaced by the Seattle Thunder.

== History ==
In 2004, the first Lingerie Bowl was played during halftime of Super Bowl XXXVIII between two teams of models and actresses wearing lingerie and minimal protective football gear. The Lingerie Bowl was played for three consecutive years as an alternative Super Bowl halftime event while adding additional teams in 2005 and 2006. The event was then cancelled for various reasons in 2007, 2008, and 2009. In 2009, the event organizers launched the concept as a full league called the Lingerie Football League (LFL), culminating in the Lingerie Bowl as the championship game between the conference champions, still during the Super Bowl halftime.

The league launched its inaugural 2009–10 season with ten teams in two conferences with the Seattle Mist in the Western Conference. Each LFL team played the other four teams in its division once. Two of the games were at home and two were on the road. The Mist went 3–1 in its first season, but failed to make it to the playoffs as per the league's tie-breaking procedures.

The 2010–11 LFL season had the same schedule format as the 2009–10 season, but all games aired on MTV2. The Mist went 0–3 in the season and the last game against the Dallas Desire was cancelled due to the potential of inclement weather in the outdoor stadium and neither team winning a game. The following season, the Mist signed Angela Rypien, the daughter of former Washington Redskins' quarterback Mark Rypien, as their starting quarterback. She debuted against the Green Bay Chill on September 30, 2011. The team went 2–2 and missed the playoffs for the third straight season.

The league postponed the 2012–13 season, but the Mist played a game called the Pacific Cup against LFL Canada's BC Angels at the ShoWare Center on December 15, 2012. In January 2013, the LFL rebranded as the Legends Football League, shifted away from the Super Bowl halftime event, and moved the season to a spring and summer schedule starting in March 2013. The Mist qualified for the playoffs for the first time in the 2013 season after an undefeated regular season, but lost to the Chicago Bliss in the conference championship game. The team then missed the playoffs in 2014 after losing to the Los Angeles Temptation in their last game of the season.

In 2015, the team made it back to the playoffs and won their first Legends Cup over the Chicago Bliss 27–21. They lost to the Bliss in the Legends Cup the following season, but went on to win again in 2017 and 2019.

After the 2019 season, the LFL effectively ceased operations and restructured as the X League, replacing the Mist with the Seattle Thunder identity.

== Seasons ==
=== 2009–10 ===
Date	Opponent	Venue	Score	Record
September 11	San Diego Seduction	ShoWare Center	Won, 20–6	1–0
October 9	at Denver Dream	Dick's Sporting Goods Park	Won, 28–19	2–0
November 27	at Los Angeles Temptation	Los Angeles Sports Arena	Lost, 20–26	2–1
January 1	Dallas Desire	ShoWare Center	Won, 28–12	3–1

==== Roster ====
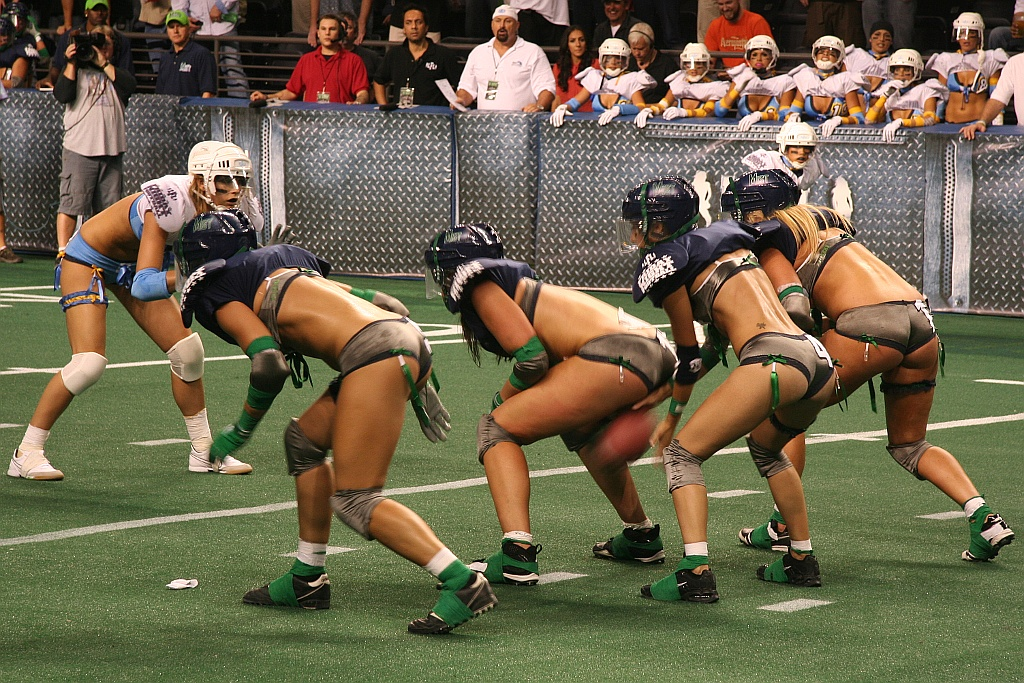
Mist players performing a hike against the San Diego Seduction on September 11, 2009

- 1 Michele Selover TE
- 2 Jenna Lynn Bloczynski LB-TE
- 3 Natalya Snetkova RB
- 4 Bruna Araujo WR
- 5 Harper Boiz S
- 6 Caya Ukkas CB
- 7 Alicia McLauchlin QB
- 8 Chelsie Jorensen OL
- 9 Maggie Pearson C
- 10 Katie Sheaffer RB
- 11 Candice Gardiner CB
- 11 Myschon Bales
- 12 Shannon Sypher WR

==== Training Camp gallery ====
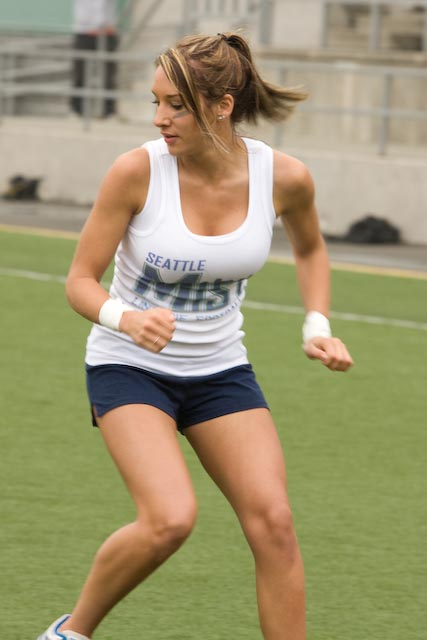

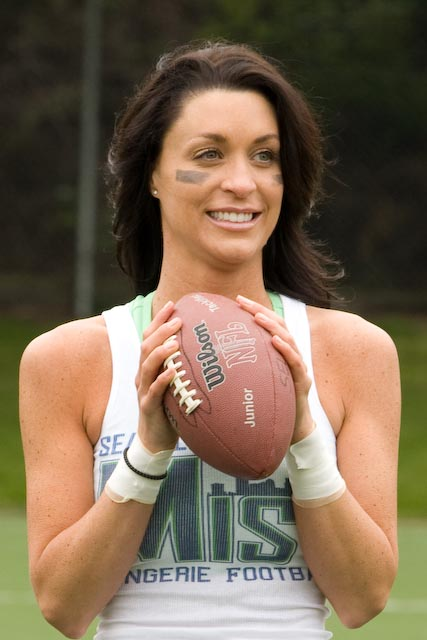

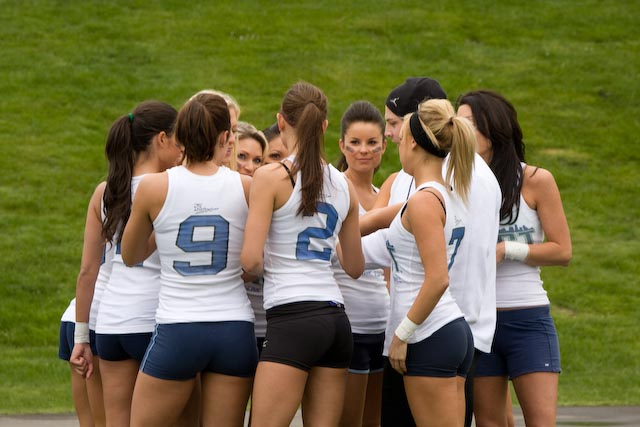

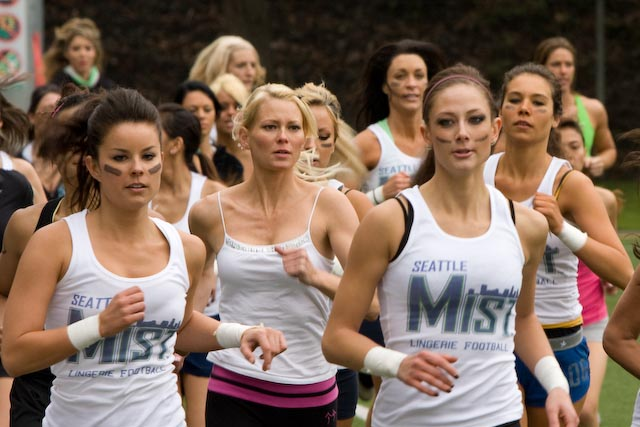

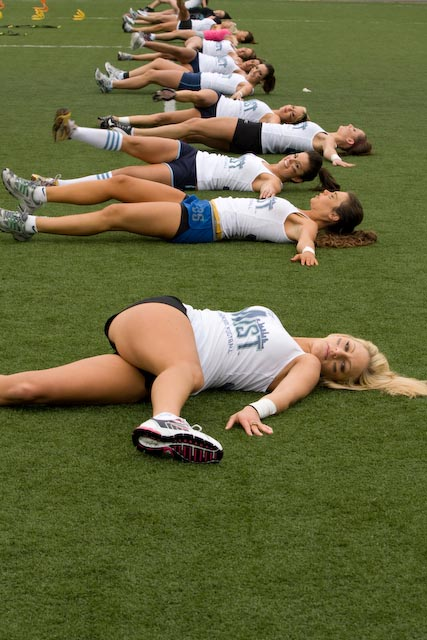

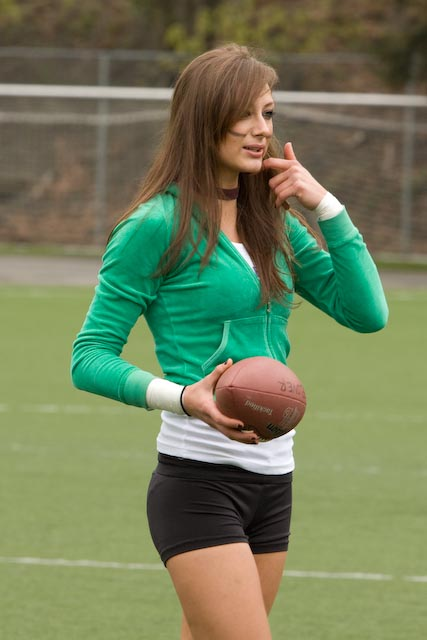

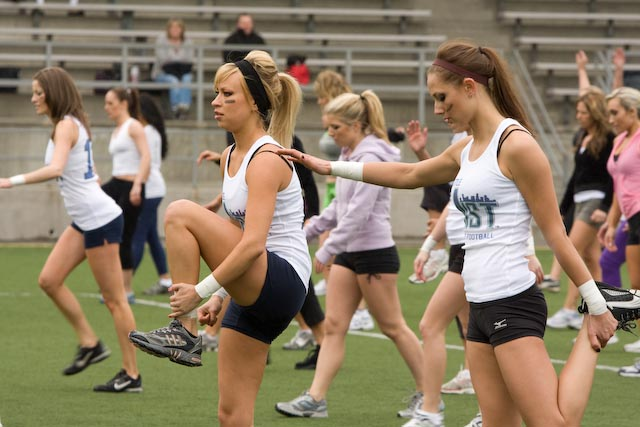

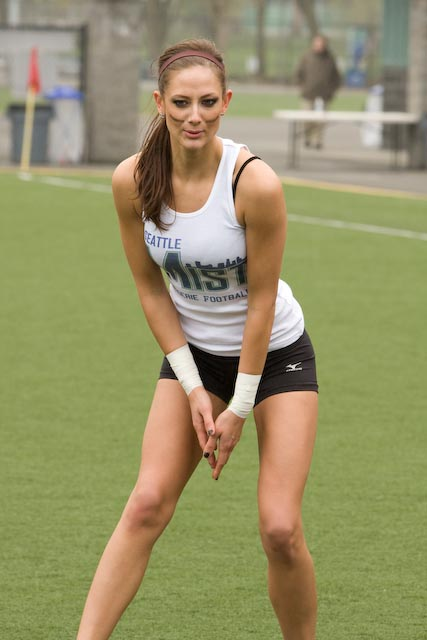

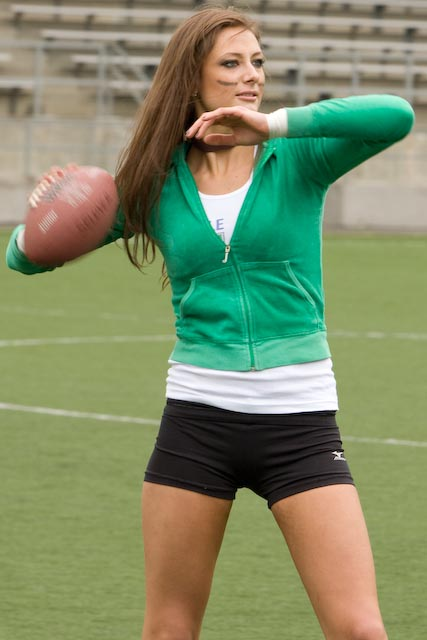

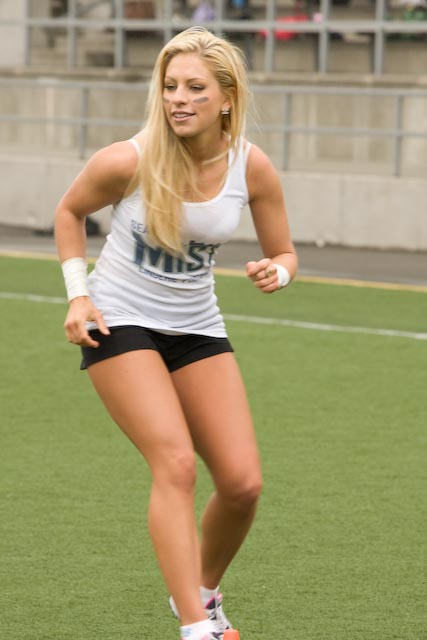

=== 2010–11 ===
Date	Opponent	Venue	Score	Record
August 27	Los Angeles Temptation	ShoWare Center	Lost, 32–36	0–1
October 8	Chicago Bliss	ShoWare Center	Lost, 12–41	0–2
October 22	at San Diego Seduction	San Diego Sports Arena	Lost, 25–26	0–3
January 21	at Dallas Desire	Cotton Bowl	Cancelled	0–3

==== Roster ====
- 1 Kiara Williams
- 2 Stevi Schnoor
- 3 Dominique Maloy
- 4 Katie Whelan
- 5 Alli Alberts
- 6 Kristine Cortez
- 7 Emily Schneider
- 8 Alanna Vann
- 9 Kera Bryant
- 10 Savannah Wood
- 11 Stacey Jackman
- 12 Vonetta Gooden
- 13 Amber Camp
- 14 Shea Norton
- 15 KK Matheny
- 16 Kenia Diggit
- 18 Jade Randle
- 19 Denise Simens
- 20 Ja'Melia Adams

=== 2011–12 season ===
Date	Opponent	Venue	Score	Record
September 30	at Green Bay Chill	Resch Center	Won, 42–8	1–0
November 4	Las Vegas Sin	ShoWare Center	Lost, 24–28	1–1
December 16	at Los Angeles Temptation	Citizens Business Bank Arena	Lost, 24–27	1–2
January 6	Minnesota Valkyrie	ShoWare Center	Won, 32–14	2–2

==== Roster ====
- 1 Laurel Creel QB-DB
- 2 Ericka Smith WR-DB
- 3 Natalie Suhey OL-DL
- 4 Riki Creger-Zier WR-DB
- 5 Jessica Hopkins WR-S
- 6 Kerry Warren OL-LB
- 7 Kam Warner RB-LB
- 9 Cristina Fetzer CB-C
- 10 Lashaunda Fowler OL-DL
- 11 Angela Rypien QB-S
- 12 Christine Moore C-DL
- 13 Emily Bell CB-RB
- 14 Melissa Bernasconi WR-S
- 15 Shea Norton OL-DL

=== 2013 season ===
Date	Opponent	Venue	Score	Record
April 6	Green Bay Chill	ShoWare Center	Lost, 36–55	0–1
May 4	at Los Angeles Temptation	Citizens Business Bank Arena	Won, 24–20	1–1
July 6	Minnesota Valkyrie	ShoWare Center	Won, 38–0	2–1
July 20	at Las Vegas Sin	Orleans Arena	Won, 52–14	3–1
Conference Championship
August 24	Chicago Bliss	Citizens Business Bank Arena; Ontario, California	Lost, 14–31	

==== Roster ====
- 1 Laurel Creel QB-DB
- 2 Mele Rich WR-DB
- 3 Natalie Suhey OL-DL
- 4 Riki Creger-Zier WR-DB
- 5 Jessica Hopkins WR-S
- 6 Kerry Warren OL-LB
- 7 Shuree Hyatt C-DE
- 9 Cristina Fetzer CB-C
- 10 Lashaunda Fowler OL-DL
- 11 Stormy Keffeler QB-S
- 12 Christine Moore C-DL
- 13 Emily Bell CB-RB
- 14 Melissa Bernasconi WR-S
- 15 Shea Norton OL-DL

=== 2014 season ===
Date	Opponent	Venue	Score	Record
May 2	Green Bay Chill	ShoWare Center	Won, 38–24	1–0
June 13	at Chicago Bliss	Sears Centre Arena	Tied, 34–34	1–0–1
July 26	Las Vegas Sin	ShoWare Center	Won, 29–18	2–0–1
August 2	at Los Angeles Temptation	Citizens Business Bank Arena	Lost, 34–12	2–1–1

==== Roster ====
- 2 Stevi Schnoor RB-DE
- 3 Rachel Corey WR-DB
- 4 Maria Bottenberg WR-DB
- 5 Jessica Hopkins WR-S
- 6 Melanie Ohlenkamp WR-DB
- 7 Lily Granston SS
- 8 Erica Legaspi WR-S
- 9 Kasey Carter TE-LB
- 10 Lashaunda Fowler WR-DE
- 11 Angela Rypien QB
- 12 Maryanne Hanson QB
- 13 Stormy Keffeler C-DE
- 14 Veronica Velludo QB-S
- 15 Rebecca Velludo WR-DB
- 17 Megan Hanson C-DE
- 18 Ashlye Parker TE-DE
- 20 Deanna Schaper-Kotter DE

=== 2015 season ===
Date	Opponent	Venue	Score	Record
May 29	Los Angeles Temptation	ShoWare Center	Lost, 13–14	0–1
June 6	at Los Angeles Temptation	Los Angeles Memorial Coliseum	Won, 27–26	1–1
June 21	at Las Vegas Sin	Citizens Business Bank Arena	Won, 34–26	2–1
July 3	Los Angeles Temptation	ShoWare Center	Won, 24–13	3–1
August 1	Las Vegas Sin	ShoWare Center	Won, 64–19	4–1
August 5	at Las Vegas Sin	Citizens Business Bank Arena	Cancelled (Note: The league ruled a "No Contest" and cancelled the game to prevent possible injury in a game that would not affect the playoff standings.)	4–1
Conference Championship
August 15	Los Angeles Temptation	Toyota Park; Bridgeview, Illinois	Won, 28–24	
Legends Cup
August 23	Chicago Bliss	ShoWare Center	Won, 27–21	

==== Roster ====
- 0 Jena Weiss C
- 1 Kadi Findling CB-QB
- 2 Stevi Schnoor RB-DE
- 3 Jessika Howard WR-DB
- 4 Katie Whelan DE-TE
- 5 Jessica Hopkins S-WR
- 6 Theresa Petruziello WR-SS
- 7 Lily Granston SS-RB
- 8 Danika Brace LB-TE
- 9 Chloe Treleven WR-DB
- 10 Lashaunda Fowler WR-CB
- 12 Emily Woods WR-DB
- 13 Kasey Carter C-DE
- 14 Mele Gilmore RB-CB
- 15 KK Matheny QB
- 17 Megan Hanson C-DE-CB
- 18 Erica Legaspi RB-DB
- 19 Bryn Renda WR-S
- 20 Deanna Schaper-Kotter DE

=== 2016 season ===
Date	Opponent	Venue	Score	Record
April 9	Austin Acoustic	ShoWare Center	Won, 44–8	1–0
April 24	at Los Angeles Temptation	Citizens Business Bank Arena	Won, 20–12	2–0
May 13	Chicago Bliss	ShoWare Center	Won, 40–28	3–0
June 18	at Dallas Desire	Dr Pepper Arena	Lost, 21–26	3–1
Conference Championship
August 20	Dallas Desire	ShoWare Center	Won, 44–6	
Legends Cup
August 27	Chicago Bliss	WestWorld; Scottsdale, Arizona	Lost, 26–31	

=== 2017 season ===
Date	Opponent	Venue	Score	Record
April 14	at Austin Acoustic	Cedar Park Center	Won, 46–26	1–0
May 20	Denver Dream	ShoWare Center	Won, 106–0	2–0
July 1	at Denver Dream	Budweiser Events Center	Won, 98–0	3–0
July 15	Austin Acoustic	ShoWare Center	Won, 62–6	4–0
Conference Championship
August 20	Los Angeles Temptation	Sears Centre Arena; Hoffman Estates, Illinois	Won, 28–13	
Legends Cup
September 3	Atlanta Steam	Citizens Business Bank Arena; Ontario, California	Won, 38–28	

=== 2018 season ===
Date	Opponent	Venue	Score	Record
May 19	Nashville Knights	ShoWare Center	Lost, 24–43	0–1
June 16	at Atlanta Steam	Infinite Energy Arena	Lost, 42–44	0–2
July 21	at Austin Acoustic	H-E-B Center	Won, 41–26	1–2
July 28	Atlanta Steam	ShoWare Center	Lost, 18–40	1–3

=== 2019 season ===
Date	Opponent	Venue	Score	Record
April 5	at Los Angeles Temptation	Citizens Business Bank Arena	Won, 34–19	1–0
May 11	Omaha Heart	ShoWare Center	Won, 70–6	2–0
June 8	at Denver Dream	Budweiser Event Center	Won, 62–22	3–0
June 29	Austin Acoustic	ShoWare Center	Lost, 34–36	3–1
Playoff semifinal
August 24	Atlanta Steam	Toyota Arena; Ontario, California	Won, 38–14	
Legends Cup
September 7	Los Angeles Temptation	accesso ShoWare Center	Won, 56–20	
