= Chicago Bliss =

Women's American football team

Logo

General information
- Founded: 2004
- Folded: 2019
- Stadium: Sears Centre Arena
- Headquartered: Hoffman Estates, Illinois, United States
- Colors: Orange and blue

Personnel
- Head coach: Keith Hac (2009–2018); Sidney Lewis (2019)

League / conference affiliations
- Legends Football League; Eastern Conference

Championships
- Legends Cup wins: 4; 2013, 2014, 2016, 2018
- Conference championships: 6 Eastern Conference Champions: 2009, 2015, 2016, 2018; Western Conference Champions 2013, 2014

The Chicago Bliss were a women's American football team based in the Chicago area. The Bliss were one of the first four teams to participate in the Lingerie Bowl and were carried over to the formation of the Lingerie Football League (LFL) in 2009. After the formation of the league, the Bliss played at multiple indoor and outdoor venues. In 2013, the league rebranded as the Legends Football League. The Bliss were the LFL team with the most wins and the most championship titles. At the conclusion of the 2019 season, the Bliss had a league-best 40–14–1 all-time record and four Legends Cup wins.

Following the 2019 season, the LFL ceased operations and relaunched as the Extreme Football League (X League), which first played in 2022. All former LFL teams received new brands and the Bliss were replaced by the Chicago Blitz.

== History ==
The Chicago Bliss is one of four teams that were introduced in 2004 for the inaugural Lingerie Bowl along with the Dallas Desire, Los Angeles Temptation, and New York Euphoria. The Bliss were defeated by New York Euphoria in the 2005 Eastern Final (where one of the Semi-Finals included a Skill Test, a 3-on-2 match, and a dance competition) at Lingerie Bowl II and then were defeated again by New York in the 2006 Eastern Final at Lingerie Bowl III. Lingerie Bowls IV, V, and VI were then all cancelled for various reasons.

In 2009, the Lingerie Football League (LFL) was launched with multiple games in a season instead of just an annual event. On September 4, 2009, the Chicago Bliss defeated the Miami Caliente 29–19 in the first ever game of the LFL at Sears Centre Arena in Hoffman Estates, Illinois. In 2009 the coaching staff consisted of Bliss Head Coach Keith Hac, coach of the Indoor Football League's Chicago Slaughter.; Offensive Coordinator Rasche Hill, a former member of the National Football League Jacksonville Jaguars and the Chicago Slaughter; and Defensive Coordinator DeJuan Alfonzo, a former member of the Chicago Rush and Chicago Slaughter. The Bliss defeated the Miami Caliente 20–7 to win the Eastern Conference title but fell 27–14 to the Los Angeles Temptation in Lingerie Bowl VII. Professional wrestler Danielle Moinet also played with Chicago Bliss from 2008 through 2011, where she was cornerback and team captain.

Keith Hac coached Chicago for nine seasons with a 29–6–1 regular season record. Under Hac, Chicago qualified for the playoffs eight times, reached the Legends Cup six times (2009, 2013, 2014, 2015, 2016, and 2018), and won the championship four times (2013, 2014, 2016, and 2018). His overall record was 40–10–1 making him the winningest coach in the league's history and the only coach (as of 2022) to win 40 games.

Sidney Lewis became head coach in 2019 and in two seasons has gone 2–4 in the regular season, qualifying for the playoffs in 2022.

In 2013, the Lingerie Football league was rebranded as the Legends Football League and shifted to a summer and fall season schedule. On September 1, 2013, the Bliss then won their first championship, now called the Legends Cup, over the Philadelphia Passion. They would repeat as champions the next year, appear in four consecutive championships including a third title, and win a fourth title in 2018. The Bliss had since used both Sears Centre Arena and Toyota Park in Bridgeview, Illinois, in various seasons as their home venue.

== Seasons ==
=== 2009–10 schedule ===
Date	Opponent	Location	Result
September 4	Miami Caliente	Sears Centre Arena	Won, 29–19
October 2	New York Majesty	Nassau Veterans Memorial Coliseum	No contest
December 4	Tampa Breeze	St. Pete Times Forum	Won, 27–18
December 18	Philadelphia Passion	Sears Centre Arena	Won, 46–19
Eastern Conference Championship
February 4	Miami Caliente	Seminole Hard Rock Live Arena	Won, 20–7
Lingerie Bowl VII
February 6	Los Angeles Temptation	Seminole Hard Rock Live Arena	Lost, 14–27

=== 2010–11 schedule ===
Date	Opponent	Location	Result
September 10	Dallas Desire	Sears Centre Arena	Won, 14–10
October 2	Seattle Mist	ShoWare Center	Won, 41–12
November 14	San Diego Seduction	Sears Centre Arena	Won, 50–12
December 18	Los Angeles Temptation	Los Angeles Memorial Coliseum	Lost, 12–18
Western Conference Championship
January 29	Los Angeles Temptation	Veterans Memorial Arena	Lost, 14–31

=== 2011–12 schedule ===
Date	Opponent	Location	Result
September 2	Las Vegas Sin	Toyota Park	Lost, 20–32
October 7	Green Bay Chill	Toyota Park	Lost, 34–36
November 19	Minnesota Valkyrie	Target Center	Won, 40–33
January 20	Los Angeles Temptation	Citizens Business Bank Arena	Lost, 26–42

=== 2013 schedule ===
Date	Opponent	Location	Result
April 19	Los Angeles Temptation	Sears Centre Arena	Lost, 18–31
May 10	Las Vegas Sin	Sears Centre Arena	Won, 34–12
July 26	Minnesota Valkyrie	Target Center	Won, 25–12
August 10	Green Bay Chill	Resch Center	Won, 27–18
Divisional Playoffs
August 17	Los Angeles Temptation	Sears Centre Arena	Won, 19–12
Conference Championship
August 24	Seattle Mist	Citizens Business Bank Arena	Won, 31–14
Legends Cup
September 1	Philadelphia Passion	Orleans Arena	Won, 38–14

=== 2014 schedule ===
Date	Opponent	Location	Result
May 9	Los Angeles Temptation	Sears Centre Arena	Won, 25–21
June 13	Seattle Mist	Sears Centre Arena	Tie, 34–34
July 3	Las Vegas Sin	Thomas & Mack Center	Won, 27–18
July 12	Green Bay Chill	US Cellular Arena	Won, 32–7
Western Conference Championship
August 24	Los Angeles Temptation	Citizens Business Bank Arena	Won, 40–12
Legends Cup
September 1	Atlanta Steam	Citizens Business Bank Arena	Won, 24–18

=== 2015 schedule ===
Date	Opponent	Location	Result
April 11	Atlanta Steam	Arena at Gwinnett Center	Won, 27–24
April 25	Omaha Heart	Toyota Park	Won, 49–0
May 10	Atlanta Steam	Toyota Park	Won, 29–13
June 13	Omaha Heart	Ralston Arena	Won, 40–0
August 8	Omaha Heart	Ralston Arena	Won, 26–0
Eastern Conference Championship
August 15	Atlanta Steam	Toyota Park	Won, 41–6
Legends Cup
August 23	Seattle Mist	Away	Lost, 21–27

=== 2016 schedule ===
Date	Opponent	Location	Result
May 14	Seattle Mist	ShoWare Center	Lost, 28–40
June 25	New England Liberty	Verizon Wireless Arena	Won, 70–7
July 2	Omaha Heart	Toyota Park	Won, 66–0
August 6	Atlanta Steam	Toyota Park	Won, 39–32
Eastern Conference Championship
August 20	Atlanta Steam	ShoWare Center	Won, 30–25
Legends Cup
August 27	Seattle Mist	WestWorld	Won, 31–26

=== 2017 schedule ===
Date	Opponent	Location	Result
April 29	Denver Dream	Budweiser Events Center	Won, 93–6
June 3	Atlanta Steam	Toyota Park	Won, 34–27
July 22	Omaha Heart	Ralston Arena	Won, 60–0
July 29	Denver Dream	Toyota Park	Won, 66–0
Eastern Conference Championship
August 20	Atlanta Steam	Sears Centre Arena	Lost, 6–14

=== 2018 schedule ===
Date	Opponent	Location	Result
April 14	Los Angeles Temptation	Sears Centre Arena	Won, 28–6
May 11	Los Angeles Temptation	Citizens Business Bank Arena	Won, 34–18
July 14	Atlanta Steam	Infinite Energy Arena	Won, 52–34
August 11	Omaha Heart	Sears Centre Arena	Won, 76–0
Eastern Conference Championship
August 25	Nashville Knights	Toyota Park	Won, 18–6
Legends Cup
September 8	Austin Acoustic	H-E-B Center	Won, 28–20

=== 2019 schedule ===
Date	Opponent	Location	Result
April 20	Los Angeles Temptation	Sears Centre Arena	Lost, 8–30
May 4	Austin Acoustic	H-E-B Center	Lost, 8–38
June 15	Atlanta Steam	Infinite Energy Arena	Lost, 25–30
July 20	Nashville Knights	Sears Centre Arena	Lost, 6–8
