= Austin Acoustic =

Women's American football team

General information
- Founded: Fall 2015 (operations); 2016 (first season)
- Folded: 2019
- Stadium: H-E-B Center
- Headquartered: Cedar Park, Texas
- Colors: Burnt orange, white
- Website: lflus.com/austinacoustic

League / conference affiliations
- Legends Football League; Western Conference

Championships
- Division championships: 1 (2018)

The Austin Acoustic were a women's American football team based in Austin, Texas. The Acoustic competed a member of the Legends Football League (LFL) with home games at H-E-B Center in the Austin suburb of Cedar Park, Texas.

Following the 2019 season, the LFL ceased operations and relaunched as the Extreme Football League (X League), which first played in 2022. All former LFL teams received new brands and the Acoustic were replaced by the Austin Sound.

== History ==
In the latter half of 2015, the Legends Football League (LFL) announced that two new franchises, plus a revival of the league's Dallas-area franchise, would join the league beginning with the 2016 season. The new Austin-based franchise adopted the name Acoustic, which was chosen from local fan submissions. The Acoustic were twentieth franchise in LFL history.

== Seasons ==
=== 2016 season ===
Date	Opponent	Location and city	Result	Record
April 9	at Seattle Mist	ShoWare Center; Kent, Washington	Lost	0–1
April 30	vs. New England Liberty	Cedar Park Center (Note: The H-E-B Center was previously known as Cedar Park Center until the 2018 renaming.)	Won, 42–21	1–1
May 21	at Dallas Desire	Dr Pepper Arena; Frisco, Texas	Lost, 6–46	1–2
June 11	vs. Los Angeles Temptation	Cedar Park Center	Lost, 32–49	1–3

=== 2017 season ===
Date	Opponent	Location and city	Result	Record
April 14	vs. Seattle Mist	Cedar Park Center	Lost, 26–46	0–1
June 17	at Atlanta Steam	Infinite Energy Arena, Duluth, Georgia	Lost, 31–67	0–2
June 24	vs. Los Angeles Temptation	Cedar Park Center	Lost, 28–56	0–3
July 15	at Seattle Mist	ShoWare Center, Kent, Washington	Lost, 6–62	0–4

=== 2018 season ===
Date	Opponent	Location and city	Result	Record
April 21	at Nashville Knights	Nashville Municipal Auditorium; Nashville, Tennessee	Lost, 26–51	0–1
May 5	vs. Atlanta Steam	H-E-B Center, Cedar Park, Texas	Won, 18–14	1–1
June 9	at Los Angeles Temptation	Citizens Business Bank Arena; Ontario, California	Won, 16–14	2–1
July 21	vs. Seattle Mist	H-E-B Center	Lost, 26–41	2–2
Western Conference Championship
August 25	Los Angeles Temptation	Toyota Park, Bridgeview, Illinois	Won, 32–30	3–2
Legends Cup 2018
September 8	vs. Chicago Bliss	H-E-B Center, Cedar Park, Texas	Lost, 20–28	3–3

=== 2019 season ===
Date	Opponent	Location and city	Result	Record
May 4	vs. Chicago Bliss	H-E-B Center	Won, 38–8	1–0
June 29	at Seattle Mist	Accesso ShoWare Center; Kent, Washington	Win, 38–34	2–0
July 27	vs. Los Angeles Temptation	H-E-B Center	Won, 33–26	3–0
August 10	at Nashville Knights	Nashville Municipal Auditorium; Nashville, Tennessee	Won, 20–18	4–0
Playoff semifinal
August 24	at Los Angeles Temptation	Toyota Arena; Ontario, California	Lost, 29–39	4–1
