= New England Liberty =

Former American women's football team

Logo

General information
- Founded: 2016
- Folded: 2016
- Stadium: Verizon Wireless Arena
- Headquartered: Manchester, New Hampshire
- Colors: Blue, red, white
- Website: www.lflus.com/newenglandliberty

League / conference affiliations
- Legends Football League; Eastern Conference

The New England Liberty was a women's American football team that played in the Legends Football League for the 2016 season. They played their games at the Verizon Wireless Arena in Manchester, New Hampshire.

Their inaugural season got off to a rocky start with a bench clearing brawl after an opening game loss to the Omaha Heart. After losing their first three games, they were forced to forfeit their final game against Atlanta Steam due to being unable to field a full team because of injuries. The team did not return for the 2017 season and was replaced by the Pittsburgh Rebellion.
