= Legends Cup (LFL) =

American football championship game

The Legends Cup, originally known as the Lingerie Bowl, was the championship game of the LFL—originally the Lingerie Football League and later the Legends Football League—which operated from 2009 to 2019. It was a game of full-contact American football with female athletes playing seven-on-seven tackle football. The players in the game wore helmets, shoulder pads, elbow pads, knee pads, bras and underwear. The LFL ceased operation following its 2019 season, with its assets sold to Mike Ditka and used as the basis for his X League, which to date has played one season, in 2022, and has repeatedly postponed subsequent seasons. The X League's championship game is branded as the "X Cup".

== History ==
Originally played as an annual Super Bowl halftime alternative shown on pay-per-view TV, Lingerie Bowl I aired during Super Bowl XXXVIII in 2004 with Team Euphoria losing to the Team Dream by a score of 6–0. Two more games were subsequently played (Lingerie Bowl II in 2005 and Lingerie Bowl III in 2006) however the next three (Lingerie Bowl IV (2007), Lingerie Bowl V (2008) and Lingerie Bowl VI (2009)) were for various reasons cancelled. In 2010 Producer Horizon Productions expanded the concept into a ten team league called the Lingerie Football League (LFL), playing its first season from September 2009 to January 2010 on Friday nights in major arenas and stadiums. Lingerie Bowl VII (2010) served as the championship match for the season. Since then the Lingerie Bowl has been contested between the Eastern and Western Conference champions of the LFL. For the 2012 Lingerie Bowl, the game was moved to kickoff before the Super Bowl, rather than be played as an alternative halftime entertainment option. In 2012, the LFL underwent a re-branding, changing its name to the Legends Football League and the championship game to the Legends Cup.

For the first three games the halftime special included celebrities such as Jenny McCarthy, Dennis Rodman, Chingy, Eric Dickerson, Lawrence Taylor, Cindy Margolis, Traci Bingham, Michael Buffer and Jim McMahon. Previous Lingerie Bowls have taken place at the Los Angeles Memorial Coliseum.

== Lingerie Bowls ==
=== Lingerie Bowl (2004) ===
The first Lingerie Bowl between two teams of models and actresses—Team Dream and Team Euphoria, captained by Nikki Ziering and Angie Everhart. Team Dream shut-out Euphoria with a single touchdown, winning the inaugural game 6–0.

=== Lingerie Bowl II (2005) ===
Los Angeles Temptation defeated New York Euphoria

=== Lingerie Bowl III (2006) ===
New York Euphoria 13-12 Los Angeles Temptation

=== Lingerie Bowl IV (2007) ===
Lingerie Bowl IV was to air opposite Super Bowl XLI's halftime show, but the PPV broadcast was cancelled. Horizon had announced that the cancellation was due to having reached a deal with an unspecified cable network to broadcast the following year's game.

=== Lingerie Bowl V (2008) ===
The game was announced to be held at a downtown golf course in Scottsdale, Arizona (a neighbor to Super Bowl XLII host city Glendale, Arizona) as the first Lingerie Bowl to be held outside of Los Angeles. Organizers had planned a three-day "Experience Village" in downtown Scottsdale, including activities, live music, autograph sessions, and a "Football After Dark" party on the eve of the game, but no formal applications had been approved as of February 2007. Residents of Scottsdale also displayed opposition towards the hosting of the event in the city. After withdrawing formal applications with the city in October 2007, Horizon continued to promote that the game would be held somewhere around Phoenix, but these plans never materialized. A Horizon spokesperson eventually reported that the game had been cancelled, as the time spent on attempting to obtain permits to organize the events in Scottsdale had "[limited] our possibilities in neighboring cities." Additionally, Horizon did not elaborate on the previously announced broadcasting deal it had allegedly reached for Lingerie Bowl V.

=== Lingerie Bowl VI (2009) ===
Lingerie Bowl VI, between the Miami Caliente and the Tampa Breeze, was scheduled for January 31, 2009 to be played at Caliente Resorts, a nudist resort in Pasco County, Florida (near Super Bowl XLIII host city Tampa Bay). The game was cancelled due to conflicts between the organizers and the resort over clothing requirements; a spokesperson for the resort stated that the organizers were "wanting more areas of our resort restricted to clothing required than we could accommodate."

=== Lingerie Bowl VII (2010) ===
Lingerie Bowl VII featured the winners of the LFL's Western and Eastern Conference in a game played on February 6, 2010, at the Seminole Hard Rock Hotel and Casino in Hollywood, Florida. The game was intended to be webcast opposite Super Bowl XLIV's halftime show in Miami Gardens, Florida, on February 7, 2010. The Western Conference Los Angeles Temptation defeated the Eastern Conference Chicago Bliss by the score of 27–14. Server problems and "overwhelming internet demand" kept fans from streaming the Lingerie Bowl game video until more than an hour after the conclusion of the Super Bowl.

=== Lingerie Bowl VIII (2011) ===
Lingerie Bowl VIII featured the defending champion Los Angeles Temptation, winners of the Western Conference, against the Eastern Conference winning Philadelphia Passion. The Temptation defeated the Passion, 26–25, at the Thomas & Mack Center in Las Vegas, Nevada. Approximately 3,000 fans attended the game. The game returned to traditional pay-per-view television instead of the failed Internet broadcast from the previous year.

=== Lingerie Bowl IX (2012) ===
The Orleans Arena was selected as the host venue for Lingerie Bowl IX played on February 5, 2012. The game moved to before the Super Bowl, instead of its usual halftime, to allow a full game to be played instead of the abbreviated games of previous years; the game also aired on MTV2 instead of on pay-per-view.

=== Lingerie Bowl Canada I (2012) ===
With the creation of LFL Canada the first Canadian Lingerie Bowl was played on November 17, 2012, between the Saskatoon Sirens and the BC Angels at the Abbotsford Entertainment & Sports Centre in Abbotsford, British Columbia, one week before the CFL's Grey Cup. The BC Angels won the inaugural championship game 25–12 with BC Angels' quarterback Mary Ann Hanson the game's MVP.

=== Legends Cup (2013) ===
In 2012, the league decided to officially move the next LFL United States season to a spring league, beginning in April 2013. Along with the re-branding of the league, the now Legends Cup was to be played at Highmark Stadium in Pittsburgh, Pennsylvania on September 1, 2013. However, due to ticket sales exceeding the 3,000 seat capacity of Highmark, an announcement was made on June 1, 2013, that the game would be moved to Philadelphia's PPL Park, the 2013 home of the Philadelphia Passion. On July 5, 2013, LFL once again moved the game, this time back to the Orleans Arena in Las Vegas, citing an agreement having been made to have the publicized game played there for the next 3 years.

=== LFL Canada Legends Cup 2013 ===
The 2013 LFL Canada Legends Cup was scheduled to be played on Saturday, 16 November 2013 at Stampede Corral in Calgary, Alberta between the first and second placed teams of the 2013 LFL Canada season.

=== LFL Australian Legends Cup 2013–14 ===
With the creation of LFL Australia the first 2013–14 LFL Australian Legends Cup was scheduled to be played on Saturday, 8 February 2014 at nib Stadium in Perth between the first and second placed teams of the 2013–14 LFL Australia season.

== Results ==
Game	Winner	Final score	Loser	Venue	City	Date
Lingerie Bowl I	Team Dream	6–0	Team Euphoria	Los Angeles Memorial Coliseum	Los Angeles	2/1/2004
Lingerie Bowl II	Los Angeles Temptation		Team Euphoria	Los Angeles Memorial Coliseum	Los Angeles	2/6/2005
Lingerie Bowl III	New York Euphoria	13–12	Los Angeles Temptation	Los Angeles Memorial Coliseum	Los Angeles	2/5/2006
Lingerie Bowl IV	Cancelled					
Lingerie Bowl V	Cancelled					
Lingerie Bowl VI	Cancelled			Caliente Resorts	Pasco County, Florida	1/31/2009
Lingerie Bowl VII	Los Angeles Temptation	27–14	Chicago Bliss	Seminole Hard Rock Hotel and Casino	Hollywood, Florida	2/6/2010
Lingerie Bowl VIII	Los Angeles Temptation	26–25	Philadelphia Passion	Thomas & Mack Center	Paradise, Nevada	2/6/2011
Lingerie Bowl IX	Los Angeles Temptation	28–6	Philadelphia Passion	Orleans Arena	Paradise, Nevada	2/5/2012
Lingerie Bowl Canada I	BC Angels	25–12	Saskatoon Sirens	Abbotsford Entertainment & Sports Centre	Abbotsford, British Columbia	11/17/2012
LFL US Legends Cup 2013	Chicago Bliss	34–18	Philadelphia Passion	Orleans Arena	Paradise, Nevada	9/1/2013
LFL Canada Legends Cup 2013	Cancelled			Stampede Corral	Calgary, Alberta	11/16/2013
LFL Australia Legends Cup 2013–14	New South Wales Surge	36–15	Western Australia Angels	nib Stadium	Perth, Western Australia	2/8/2014
LFL US Legends Cup 2014	Chicago Bliss	24–18	Atlanta Steam	Citizens Business Bank Arena	Ontario, California	9/6/2014
LFL US Legends Cup 2015	Seattle Mist	27–21	Chicago Bliss	ShoWare Center	Kent, Washington	8/23/2015
LFL US Legends Cup 2016	Chicago Bliss	31–26	Seattle Mist	WestWorld	Scottsdale, Arizona	8/28/2016
LFL US Legends Cup 2017	Seattle Mist	38–28	Atlanta Steam	Citizens Business Bank Arena	Ontario, California	9/3/2017
LFL US Legends Cup 2018	Chicago Bliss	28–20	Austin Acoustic	H-E-B Center	Cedar Park, Texas	9/8/2018
LFL US Legends Cup 2019	Seattle Mist	56–20	Los Angeles Temptation	accesso ShoWare Center	Kent, Washington	9/7/2019
