= Super Bowl counterprogramming =

Programming during the Super Bowl

Although the Super Bowl is consistently one of the most watched television programs in the United States annually, broadcasters have sometimes attempted to intentionally counterprogram against it by running new programming against the game as an alternative, such as special episodes of existing series, one-off special presentations, and previews of new series, typically during its halftime break.

The most prominent success of the concept came in 1992, when Fox broadcast a special, live edition of its sketch comedy program In Living Color during halftime at Super Bowl XXVI, taking advantage of the then-unpopular format of Super Bowl halftime shows. The special drew 22 million viewers, prompting the NFL to book more prominent pop music acts to perform at future Super Bowl halftime shows to compete.

Most broadcasters would typically air reruns of existing programming or sometimes as marathons, prior to and during the game; in recent years, as all four major networks broadcast NFL games to an extent (all of them alternate airing the game yearly) the networks not airing the Super Bowl rarely broadcast new programming against it, to the point that the broadcast rights to Super Bowl LV and LVI were traded to prevent a CBS-broadcast Super Bowl LVI from competing with the 2022 Winter Olympics on NBC. Some cable channels and digital platforms still attempt to air original programming intended as an alternative to halftime or the game itself, such as Animal Planet's annual Puppy Bowl special.

== History ==
In the 1970s and 1980s, the majority of Super Bowl halftime shows were themed, musical spectacles that often featured marching bands and performance ensembles such as Up with People (who performed in four Super Bowl halftime shows between 1976 and 1986 and performed at the pre-game show of Super Bowl XXV in 1991). The group's halftime shows were described as being "wholesome" and "inoffensive" by critics, but were frequently derided for being dated and out of touch with modern popular culture.

Super Bowl counterprogramming was first popularized by Fox. As an alternative, the then-fledgling Fox network aired a special live episode of its popular sketch comedy show In Living Color during halftime at the 1992 Super Bowl XXVI (which featured a halftime show entitled "Winter Magic", a Winter Olympics-themed show starring Gloria Estefan, Brian Boitano, and Dorothy Hamill to tie into CBS's upcoming broadcast of the Games). The live episode featured football-themed sketches (such as Men on Football), a performance by Color Me Badd, and a clock counting down to the start of the third quarter. The episode was sponsored by Frito-Lay, who paid $2 million to hold all national advertising time, and to help budget and promote the special; the effort included a $1 million giveaway, whose winner was announced during the broadcast. A CBS executive felt that the concept was "cute", but dismissed concerns that the ambush would have any major impact on the viewership of the Super Bowl. The special drew more than 25 million viewers away from the Super Bowl; Nielsen estimated that CBS lost 10 ratings points and more than a fifth of its total viewership during halftime as a result of the special.

The unexpected success of the In Living Color special prompted the NFL to heighten the halftime show's profile to help retain viewership; beginning at Super Bowl XXVII in 1993, the NFL began to invite major pop music performers to perform during the halftime show. The first of these, featuring Michael Jackson, led to a dramatic increase in viewership between halves—the first in the game's history. Later that year, Fox acquired rights to the NFL's National Football Conference (NFC), replacing CBS, beginning in the 1994 season. The acquisition was a notable coup which helped to establish Fox's position as a major network in its own right, and also placed Fox in the broadcast rights rotation for the Super Bowl itself.

The NFL has continued to stay true to its goal of ensuring that the halftime show is as much of a spectacle as the game itself, which has complimented the absolute dominance of the Super Bowl in annual U.S. television viewership since it started holding the overall top ratings spot in 1999. Besides a string of halftime shows from 2005 to 2010 that featured veteran rock acts in the wake of the Super Bowl XXXVIII "wardrobe malfunction", the practice of inviting pop acts to perform at the Super Bowl halftime show has continued. The Super Bowl LIX halftime show featuring Kendrick Lamar was seen by an estimated 133.5 million viewers, as part of an overall telecast that was the most-watched television broadcast in American history.

As all four major U.S. television networks currently have ties to the NFL and alternate airing the Super Bowl yearly, Phil Rosenthal of the Chicago Tribune believed that there was now "zero likelihood some broadcast network is going to launch a broadside against the NFL's showcase.", while a GQ writer argued that the practice was now obsolete, due to the larger number of media options that have emerged since. As such, the networks not airing the game will typically air reruns of existing programs. Fox provided an exception in 2010, when it aired new episodes of 'Til Death during the game; Fox had been burning off the fourth season of the low-rated sitcom in unconventional time slots (such as having aired a marathon of four new episodes on Christmas Day), so its distributor would have enough episodes for syndication. The league's cable channel NFL Network also suspends programming during the game, instead airing a live scoreboard and a simulcast of the game's radio broadcast under the title Super Bowl Game Center.

Counterprogramming efforts are not limited to television; for Super Bowl XLV in 2011, WCHK-FM, a station in the Green Bay, Wisconsin area announced it would counterprogram the game with dead air, since the hometown Packers were in the game. However, its goal was not to attract listeners from the game, but to do the opposite. The freeform program Anything Anything with Rich Russo has counterprogrammed the Super Bowl with Dr. Demento.

Counterprogramming has also expanded to the internet; Jewish radio personality Nachum Segal has organized an annual Kosher Halftime Show for streaming via his Nachum Segal Network, featuring performances by Jewish musicians. The special was recorded in Atlanta for 2019, marking the first time it was held in the Super Bowl's host city. In 2015, YouTube streamed an alternative, online halftime show featuring notable personalities from the video sharing service. In 2019, the Super Smash Bros. video game tournament Genesis 6 had top-8 rounds overlapping with Super Bowl LIII, which Shacknews noted were either "intentional or completely by accident".

For the first time in the history of the game, Super Bowl LVI in 2022 fell during an ongoing Winter Olympics, the 2022 Winter Olympics in Beijing. In order to prevent the possibility that NBC would have to counterprogram CBS's telecast of the game with primetime coverage of these Olympics (which would dilute viewership and advertising sales), NBC agreed to trade 2021's Super Bowl LV to CBS in favor of Super Bowl LVI—thus giving NBC rights to both the 2022 Winter Olympics and Super Bowl LVI. NBC thus suspended its coverage of the Olympics in favor of pre-game coverage for the Super Bowl (and moved its daytime coverage that day to air in the morning before the pre-game coverage began), before resuming with primetime coverage as its lead-out. CBS, its sister premium channel Showtime, and HBO, did air new episodes of Celebrity Big Brother (which averaged five episodes per-week), Billions, and Euphoria respectively on the night of the game; HBO announced that Euphoria had achieved a series high of 5.1 million viewers, although this included live and on-demand viewership across HBO and its streaming service HBO Max.

The Winter Olympics scenario from Super Bowl LVI was codified by the addition of ABC/ESPN as a fourth Super Bowl broadcaster under the current NFL media rights that began in 2023; NBC televises Super Bowl games held in Winter Olympic years over the course of the agreement.

== List of Super Bowl counterprograms ==
Recurring Super Bowl counters have included Animal Planet's annual Puppy Bowl, a special featuring dogs at play in a model football stadium (which itself spawned imitators—the Kitten Bowl and Fish Bowl, in 2014), and the Lingerie Bowl, a series of pay-per-view broadcasts of all-female football games played in lingerie, proving popular enough to be expanded into its own Lingerie Football League with the Lingerie Bowl as its championship game. The LFL was later re-launched as a conventional women's football league, the Legends Football League, and moved its season to run during the NFL off-season instead.

During the 1990s, MTV was a recurring provider of counterprogramming, having scheduled new episodes of Beavis and Butt-head against the halftime show on multiple occasions. In 1998, MTV aired a pilot episode for a new stop-motion animated series, Celebrity Deathmatch. In the spirit of the Super Bowl airings, its official premiere in May 1998 was scheduled to air on the same night as the series finale of Seinfeld.

On several occasions, the professional wrestling promotion WWF (now WWE) broadcast special halftime editions of its Sunday-night program on USA Network at the time, Sunday Night Heat, dubbed Halftime Heat. The concept was revived for Super Bowl LIII by WWE's NXT brand as a streaming special on WWE Network and other platforms, featuring the premiere of a 6-man tag-team match at halftime, as well as a marathon of classic NXT matches.

On the day of the Super Bowl, cable channels often air special, and sometimes themed marathons of existing programming prior to and/or during the game, such as Cartoon Network having aired a marathon of 2 Stupid Dogs that it dubbed the "Stupid Bowl", DIY Network broadcasting a marathon of bathroom-related programming known as the "Toilet Bowl", a "Poppy Bowl" marathon of Dr. Pimple Popper on TLC that additionally featured behind-the-scenes content and updates on featured patients, and during Super Bowl XLV, Canadian network Global airing a marathon of Glee, and Glee-themed episodes of The Simpsons ("Elementary School Musical") and The Office ("Viewing Party") as a lead-in for "The Sue Sylvester Shuffle" after the game (competing network CTV is the Canadian rightsholder of the NFL and Super Bowl, but not Glee).

In 2025, the conservative political organization Turning Point USA announced its intent to counterprogram the Super Bowl LX halftime show in February 2026 with its own "All-American Halftime Show." This is the first major attempt at counterprogramming the event for sociopolitical reasons, as the selection of Bad Bunny—a Puerto Rican rapper who primarily performs in Spanish—as the headliner of the Super Bowl LX halftime show was criticized by some conservative pundits and president Donald Trump. The lineup was revealed in February 2026, headlined by Kid Rock, with Lee Brice, Brantley Gilbert and Gabby Barrett, and would be broadcast by conservative-leaning outlets including Sinclair Broadcast Groups Charge! and The National News Desk, Trinity Broadcasting Network, Real America's Voice, One America News Network, and NTD America.

| Super Bowl | Year | Outlet | Program | Notes |
|---|---|---|---|---|
| XXVI | 1992 | Fox | In Living Color | "In Living Color Super Halftime Party" |
| XXVIII | 1994 | MTV | Beavis and Butt-head | "Butt Bowl" |
| XXIX | 1995 | MTV | Beavis and Butt-head | "Party", "Wet Behind The Rears" |
| XXX | 1996 | MTV | Beavis and Butt-head | |
| XXXI | 1997 | MTV | Beavis and Butt-head | "Butt, Butt, Hike!", "Vaya Con Cornholio" |
| XXXII | 1998 | MTV | Celebrity Deathmatch | "Deathbowl '98": Howard Stern vs. Kathie Lee Gifford; Pamela Anderson vs. RuPaul; Hanson vs. The Spice Girls. |
| XXXIII | 1999 | USA | WWF Sunday Night Heat | "Halftime Heat": Empty arena match between The Rock and Mankind for the WWF Championship. |
| XXXIII | 1999 | MTV | Celebrity Deathmatch | "Deathbowl '99": Dolly Parton vs. Jennifer Lopez; Michael Jackson vs. Madonna; Mike Tyson vs. Evander Holyfield. |
| XXXIV | 2000 | USA | WWF Sunday Night Heat | "Halftime Heat": Royal Rumble highlights, interview with Stone Cold Steve Austin as he recovered from neck surgery. |
| XXXVI | 2002 | NBC | Fear Factor | Playboy Playmates edition; 11.4 million viewers |
| XXXVII | 2003 | NBC | Saturday Night Live, Dateline NBC | Weekend Update with Jimmy Fallon and Tina Fey; aired during halftime before the final half-hour of a 90-minute Fear Factor rerun. NBC promoted that this was the first time in SNL history that the program had broadcast live in all time zones (SNL itself followed suit beginning in the final episodes of season 42 in 2017). Fear Factor was also followed by a new Dateline NBC, and an airing of Law & Order: Criminal Intent to counter Alias on ABC after the game. |
| XXXVIII | 2004 | PPV | Lingerie Bowl | An all-female football game played in lingerie, shoulder padding, and helmets, between teams of models and actresses (Team Dream and Team Euphoria) captained by Angie Everhart and Nikki Ziering, with Mike Goldberg and Amy Weber on play-by-play. |
| XXXIX | 2005 | PPV | Girls Gone Wild | "Girls Gone Wild Halftime Games"; promoted with the tagline "Wardrobe Malfunctions Guaranteed" (in reference to the previous year's halftime show), and co-hosted by Doug Stanhope and Zane Lamprey, the hour-long PPV special featured four teams of women participating in "nudity-inducing" obstacle challenges. |
| XXXIX | 2005 | Animal Planet | Puppy Bowl | |
| XL | 2006 | Animal Planet | Puppy Bowl II | |
| XL | 2006 | PPV | Lingerie Bowl II | |
| XLI | 2007 | Animal Planet | Puppy Bowl III | |
| XLI | 2007 | Fuse | Pants-Off Dance-Off | "Pancer Bowl I"; dancers stripping football clothing to the music of Super Bowl halftime performer Prince. Fuse also broadcast a "Wardrobe Malfunction Marathon" of the program on the day of the game. |
| XLI | 2007 | Hallmark Channel | From the Heart: Favorite Commercials from Hallmark Cards | Aired during a marathon of Little House on the Prairie |
| XLI | 2007 | PPV | Lingerie Bowl III | Lingerie Bowl III would be the final Lingerie Bowl before a three-year hiatus, resulting from the cancellation of Lingerie Bowl IV due to having reached a new, non-PPV broadcasting deal, the cancellation of Lingerie Bowl V citing "[limited] possibilities in neighboring cities" after failing to receive permits for planned side events in Scottsdale, Arizona, and the cancellation of Lingerie Bowl VI after conflicts with the host, a nudist resort, over exceptions to its clothing-optional policies. A web-based PPV of Lingerie Bowl VII was to be aired during halftime of Super Bowl XLV, but was not available to stream until an hour after the game due to server capacity problems. |
| XLI | 2007 | PPV | Howard Stern's Stupid Bowl III | A flag football game between the staff of The Howard Stern Show and a team of drag queens. |
| XLII | 2008 | Animal Planet | Puppy Bowl IV | Seen by an average of 1.1 million viewers, an increase of 35% from the previous year. |
| XLII | 2008 | Spike | Major League Eating Chowdown | "Ham n' Eggs"; Joey Chestnut eating 7.01 pounds (3.18 kg) of ham and Erik Denmark eating 61 hard-boiled eggs, both in 8 minutes. With average viewership of 863,000 viewers, this was Spike's highest-rated Major League Eating special. |
| XLII | 2008 | Oxygen | Deion & Pilar: Prime Time Love | A "super-sneak preview" of the then-upcoming series starring Deion Sanders was aired against the halftime show during a marathon of Snapped. Seen by 220,000 viewers. |
| XLIII | 2009 | ABC | Wipeout | "Cheerleaders vs. Couch Potatoes"; the half-hour special was followed by a full episode, "Wipeout Bowl I", airing at 10:00 p.m. ET/PT after the game. ABC averaged 4.2 million viewers from 8:00 p.m. to 11:00 p.m. throughout the night. |
| XLIII | 2009 | CBS | CBS Reports: The Road to the White House | A CBS News special chronicling the inauguration of President Barack Obama. |
| XLIII | 2009 | Animal Planet | Puppy Bowl V | |
| XLIV | 2010 | Animal Planet | Puppy Bowl VI | |
| XLIV | 2010 | Fox | 'Til Death | The fourth season of 'Til Death was produced solely so it could be burned off by Fox, as its distributor would then have enough episodes to syndicate the low-rated sitcom. With 1.7 million viewers, Fox finished third behind the Super Bowl itself and a rerun of America's Funniest Home Videos in the 7:00 p.m. hour. |
| XLV | 2011 | Animal Planet | Puppy Bowl VII | Seen by 9.2 million viewers across all of its airings throughout the day. |
| XLV | 2011 | PPV | Lingerie Bowl VII | Los Angeles Temptation vs. Philadelphia Passion at the Thomas & Mack Center in Las Vegas. |
| XLVI | 2012 | Animal Planet | Puppy Bowl VIII | Seen by a total of over 10 million viewers, and was the second-most popular program of the day on social media behind the Super Bowl itself. |
| XLVII | 2013 | Animal Planet | Puppy Bowl IX | |
| XLVIII | 2014 | Animal Planet | Puppy Bowl X | To tie into the game taking place in the New York area, Animal Planet organized a "Puppy Bowl Experience" attraction at Discovery Times Square. The event was a parody of the NFL Experience, a fan attraction usually held in the Super Bowl's host city prior to the game (which itself was placed on hiatus for Super Bowl XLVIII in favor of an outdoor "Super Bowl Boulevard" along Broadway and Times Square). |
| XLVIII | 2014 | Hallmark Channel | Kitten Bowl | As a feline parallel to the Puppy Bowl, the broadcast consisted of kittens at play |
| XLVIII | 2014 | Nachum Segal Network | Kosher Halftime Show | Concert featuring Shlock Rock members Lenny Solomon, Avromie Weisberger, Jonathan Rimberg, Ari Boiangiu, and Ethan Bill |
| XLVIII | 2014 | Nat Geo Wild | Fish Bowl | As an aquatic parallel to the Puppy Bowl, the 4-hour broadcast consisted of a goldfish swimming in a bowl. The program was seen by 27,000 viewers. |
| XLIX | 2015 | Animal Planet | Puppy Bowl XI | New "teams", Team Ruff and Team Fluff, were added. Seen by 2.8 million viewers. |
| XLIX | 2015 | YouTube | YouTube Halftime Show | Co-produced by Collective Digital Studio and hosted by Epic Meal Time's Harley Morenstein, the special featured contributions by twenty YouTube "creators and musicians", and served to promote the site's AdBlitz channel. |
| XLIX | 2015 | Hallmark Channel | Kitten Bowl II | All of the participating kittens were named in reference to NFL players and officials. The special also featured a halftime show with "Katy Furry" in reference to the actual halftime show. Seen by 1.3 million. |
| XLIX | 2015 | Nachum Segal Network | Kosher Halftime Show | Concert with Soulfarm |
| XLIX | 2015 | Discovery Life; Discovery Family; TLC | Toddler Bowl | Featured a group of toddlers competing in physical and mental challenges. |
| XLIX | 2015 | Nat Geo Wild | Fish Bowl II | Filmed from the setting of the Nat Geo Wild series The Incredible Dr. Pol (a marathon of the series preceded the special), the second Fish Bowl was expanded to add a clownfish and farm animals as accompaniment. |
| XLIX | 2015 | VH1 Classic | Saturday Night Live 40th Anniversary Marathon | As part of VH1 Classic's Saturday Night Live 40th Anniversary marathon, SNL episodes hosted by athletes from 1987-2001 and 2007 onward were featured. Among the hosts were Phil Simms, Joe Montana, Lawrence Taylor, Joe Gibbs, Troy Aikman, Brett Favre, John Elway, Kurt Warner, Ray Lewis, Eli and Peyton Manning, Ben Roethlisberger, Aaron Rodgers and Joe Flacco. |
| 50 | 2016 | Animal Planet | Puppy Bowl XII | Seen by 2.2 million viewers. |
| 50 | 2016 | Hallmark Channel | Kitten Bowl III | |
| 50 | 2016 | Nat Geo Wild | Fish Bowl XXL | The setting was expanded to a 50-gallon tank with a larger variety of creatures. |
| 50 | 2016 | Nachum Segal Network | Kosher Halftime Show | Concert with Lipa Schmeltzer |
| 50 | 2016 | Fox | The X-Files | During the halftime period, Fox briefly posted preview footage on its website and social media outlets for the revival's season finale. |
| LI | 2017 | Animal Planet | Puppy Bowl XIII | Seen by 2.5 million viewers, a 12% gain over 2016, and the second-highest to-date. |
| LI | 2017 | Hallmark Channel | Kitten Bowl IV | |
| LI | 2017 | Nachum Segal Network | Kosher Halftime Show | Concert with Aryeh Kunstler |
| LI | 2017 | Nat Geo Wild | Fish Bowl IV | "Played" between the "Los Angeles Clams" and "Buffalo Gills", and featuring penguin commentators "Joe Duck" and "Koi Aikman". |
| LII | 2018 | Animal Planet | Puppy Bowl XIV | "Played" between the "Pawtriots" and the "Beagles"; highest adults 25-54 viewership since 2010. |
| LII | 2018 | Nachum Segal Network | Kosher Halftime Show | Concert with Ohad Moskowitz and Meir Kay |
| LII | 2018 | Hallmark Channel | Kitten Bowl V | |
| LIII | 2019 | WWE Network | WWE NXT: Halftime Heat | "Halftime Heat": 6-man tag team match: Aleister Black, Ricochet, and Velveteen Dream vs. Adam Cole, Johnny Gargano, and Tommaso Ciampa. Also streamed on Facebook, Twitter, and YouTube. |
| LIII | 2019 | Fox News Channel | Fox Nation In Depth | Cross-promotion for the channel's premium streaming service, hosted by Abby Hornacek with appearances by Brian Kilmeade, Tom Shillue, Katie Pavlich and Diamond and Silk. |
| LIII | 2019 | Animal Planet | Puppy Bowl XV | |
| LIII | 2019 | Hallmark Channel | Kitten Bowl VI | |
| LIII | 2019 | Hallmark Channel | Cat Bowl | A spin-off of the Kitten Bowl featuring adult felines. |
| LIII | 2019 | Nachum Segal Network | Kosher Halftime Show | Concert with violinist Daniel Ahaviel and rapper Sammy K |
| LIII | 2019 | Twitch | Genesis 6 | Super Smash Bros. tournament held in Oakland, California. |
| LIV | 2020 | Animal Planet | Puppy Bowl XVI | |
| LIV | 2020 | Hallmark Channel | Kitten Bowl VII | |
| LIV | 2020 | Nachum Segal Network | Kosher Halftime Show | Featuring Meir Kay, Simcha Leiner and Ashley Blaker. |
| LV | 2021 | Animal Planet | Puppy Bowl XVII | |
| LV | 2021 | Hallmark Channel | Kitten Bowl VIII | |
| LV | 2021 | Nachum Segal Network | Kosher Halftime Show | Featuring Meir Kay and 8th Day. |
| LVI | 2022 | HBO | Euphoria | "A Thousand Little Trees of Blood"; 5.1 million viewers across HBO and HBO Max. |
| LVI | 2022 | Showtime | Billions | "Burn Rate" |
| LVI | 2022 | CBS | Celebrity Big Brother 3 | "Episode 8" |
| LVI | 2022 | Animal Planet | Puppy Bowl XVIII | |
| LVI | 2022 | USA Network | 2022 Winter Olympics | |
| LVI | 2022 | Nachum Segal Network | Kosher Halftime Show | Featuring Shlomo Katz. |
| LVII | 2023 | Animal Planet | Puppy Bowl XIX | |
| LVIII | 2024 | Animal Planet | Puppy Bowl XX | |
| LIX | 2025 | Animal Planet | Puppy Bowl XXI | |
| LIX | 2025 | Nachum Segal Network | Kosher Halftime Show | Featuring Eli Begun |
| LX | 2026 | Syndication | The All-American Halftime Show | Produced by Turning Point USA, featuring Kid Rock, Lee Brice, Brantley Gilbert and Gabby Barrett. |
| LX | 2026 | USA Network | 2026 Winter Olympics | |
| LX | 2026 | Animal Planet | Puppy Bowl XXII | |
| LX | 2026 | Nachum Segal Network | Kosher Halftime Show | Featuring Yaakov Shwekey. |

== See also ==
- Counterprogramming (film distribution)
- List of Super Bowl commercials
