= Omaha Heart =

Logo

General information
- Founded: 2012
- Folded: 2019
- Stadium: Ralston Arena
- Headquartered: Ralston, Nebraska
- Colors: Red and white
- Website: www.lflus.com/omahaheart

Personnel
- Head coach: Tony Doremus

League / conference affiliations
- Legends Football League; Eastern Conference

The Omaha Heart was a women's American football team in the Legends Football League (LFL) based in Ralston, Nebraska, a suburb of Omaha. The team played two home games per season at the Ralston Arena.

The team was formed in 2012 as a member of the Lingerie Football League for the 2013 season, after the league shifted to a spring and summer schedule. The team's name was chosen in a contest from 12,000 votes. Before the 2013 season began, the league rebranded to the Legends Football League.

Following the 2019 season, the LFL ceased operations and relaunched as the Extreme Football League (X League) for the 2020 season. All former LFL teams received new brands and the Heart were replaced by the Omaha Red Devils. The 2020 season was postponed and the Omaha Red Devils never played as the brand was relocated as the Arizona Red Devils for the 2021 season.

== Seasons ==
=== 2013 season ===
Date	Opponent	Location and city	Result	Record
April 13	at Atlanta Steam	Arena at Gwinnett Center	Lost, 6-42	0–1
June 1	vs. Jacksonville Breeze	Ralston Arena	Won, 8-0	1–1
June 14	at Cleveland Crush	Quicken Loans Arena	Lost, 0-12	1–2
August 3	vs. Baltimore Charm	Ralston Arena	Lost, 6-12	1–3

=== 2014 season ===
Date	Opponent	Location and city	Result	Record
April 19	at Jacksonville Breeze	Veterans Memorial Arena	Lost, 0-25	0–1
June 7	at Atlanta Steam	Arena at Gwinnett Center	Lost, 13-20	0–2
July 18	vs. Toledo Crush	Ralston Arena	Won, 31-0	1-2
August 9	vs. Baltimore Charm	Ralston Arena	Won, 19-12	2-2

=== 2015 season ===
Date	Opponent	Location and city	Result	Record
April 18	vs. Atlanta Steam	Ralston Arena	Lost, 0-79	0-1
April 25	at Chicago Bliss	Toyota Park	Lost, 0-49	0-2
May 2	at Atlanta Steam	Arena at Gwinnett Center	Lost, 0-62	0–3
June 13	vs. Chicago Bliss	Ralston Arena	Lost, 0-40	0-4
July 10	at Atlanta Steam	Arena at Gwinnett Center	Lost, 13-71	0-5
August 8	vs. Chicago Bliss	Ralston Arena	Lost, 0-26	0-6
