= Liberty First Credit Union Arena =

Sports and events arena in Nebraska

- The Slaughterhouse
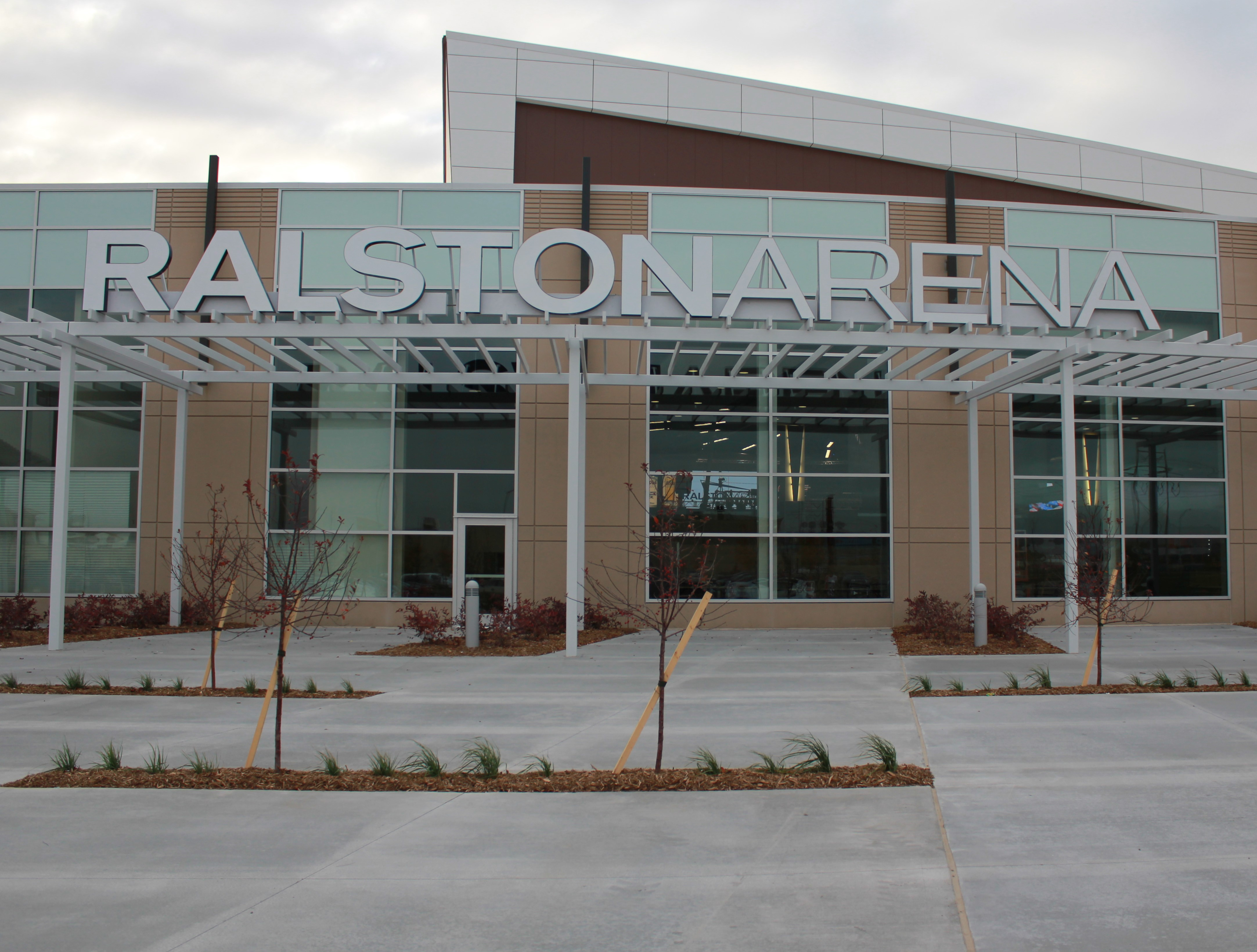

- Location within Nebraska Location within the United States
- Former names: Ralston Arena (2012–2021)
- Address: 7300 Q Street
- Location: Ralston, Nebraska, U.S.
- Coordinates: 41°12′25″N 96°01′37″W
- Owner: City of Ralston
- Operator: City of Ralston
- Capacity: 4,356 - (End Stage Concert); 4,600 - (NCAA Div I Basketball); 4,000 - (USHL Hockey)
- Surface: Multi-surface
- Public transit: Metro Transit

Construction
- Groundbreaking: June 29, 2011
- Opened: October 19, 2012
- Cost: $36.8 million ($51.6 million in 2025 dollars)
- Architect: ICON Architectural Group
- General contractor: Boyd Jones Construction

Tenants
- Omaha Lancers (USHL) (2012–present); Omaha Mavericks (NCAA) (2012–2015); Omaha Beef (CPIFL/CIF/NAL) (2013–present); Omaha Heart (LFL) (2013–2019); Omaha Rollergirls (WFTDA) (2013–present)

Website
- libertyfirstcreditunionarena.com

The Liberty First Credit Union Arena, formerly known as Ralston Arena and sometimes as Ralston Sports and Event Center, is an arena located in Ralston, Nebraska, a suburb of Omaha. It serves as the home of the Omaha Lancers of the United States Hockey League and the Omaha Beef of the National Arena League (NAL). It was home to the Omaha Mavericks NCAA Division I men's basketball team, representing the University of Nebraska Omaha, from its opening until the end of the 2014–15 season. The school opened Baxter Arena for the 2015–16 season.

It was the location of the VEX Robotics Nationals competition in 2013. The Omaha Heart, an expansion team of the Legends Football League, was announced on April 19, 2012. In October 2015, the Ralston Arena was a venue for the Women's Flat Track Derby Association Division 1 roller derby Playoffs, hosted by local league, the Omaha Rollergirls.

The arena sold the naming rights to Liberty First Credit Union on a ten-year agreement and Ralston Arena was renamed on January 1, 2022.

== Photo gallery ==
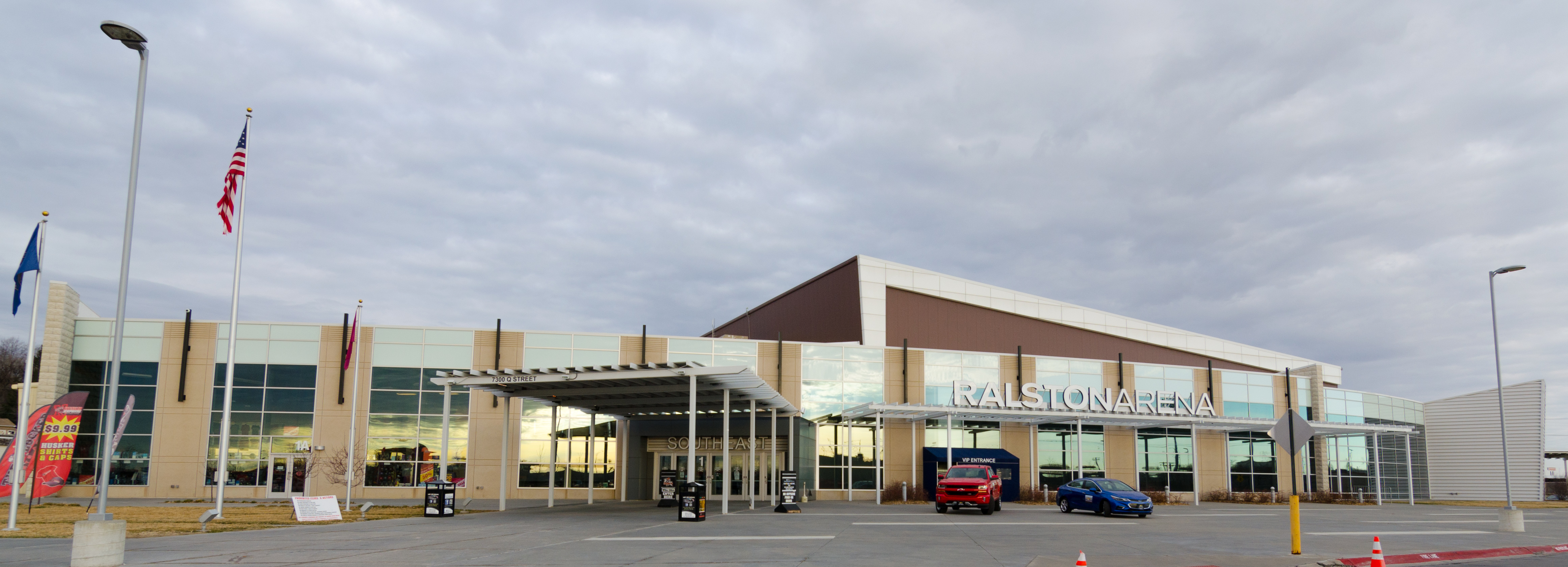
Ralston Arena just after sunrise
