= Los Angeles Temptation =

American women's gridiron football team

Logo

General information
- Founded: 2004
- Folded: 2019
- Stadium: Los Angeles Memorial Coliseum (2004–2011; 2015); Los Angeles Memorial Sports Arena (2009); Toyota Arena (2011–2014; 2016–2019)
- Headquartered: Los Angeles, California; Ontario, California
- Colors: Silver, black, and white
- Website: mylosangelestemptation.com

Personnel
- Owners: Lingerie Football League, LLC

League / conference affiliations
- Legends Football League; Western Conference

Championships
- Lingerie Bowl wins: 5; 2004, 2005, 2010, 2011, 2012
- Division championships: 5; 2004, 2005, 2010, 2011, 2012

The Los Angeles Temptation were a women's American football team in the Legends Football League (LFL) based in Los Angeles and Ontario, California. The team was established as Team Dream, one of two teams that participated in the inaugural Lingerie Bowl broadcast during Super Bowl XXXVIII in 2004. The team won the first two Lingerie Bowls, and went on to win three more, their final one in 2012. The league, originally known as the Lingerie Football League, rebranded in 2013 and shifted away from Super Bowl halftime shows.

Following the 2019 season, the LFL ceased operations and relaunched as the Extreme Football League (X League), which first played in 2022. All former LFL teams received new brands and the Temptation were replaced by the Los Angeles Black Storm.

== History ==
In 2004, the first Lingerie Bowl was played during halftime of Super Bowl XXXVIII between two teams of models and actresses wearing lingerie and minimal protective football gear. Team Dream was captained by Nikki Ziering and shutout the Angie Everhart-captained Team Euphoria with a single touchdown, winning the inaugural event 6–0. In the following year, the team was renamed Los Angeles Temptation and the Super Bowl halftime event was expanded by two more teams, the Dallas Desire and Chicago Bliss. After defeating the Dallas Desire in the Western Final (a semi-final competition that included a skill test, a 3-on-2 match, and a dance competition) with a score of 68–36, they met again with the re-named New York Euphoria at the final of Lingerie Bowl II and won again. In 2006, they defeated the Dallas Desire again in the semifinal, but lost 13–12 to the New York Euphoria in Lingerie Bowl III. The Lingerie Bowl was then cancelled for various reasons from 2007 through 2009.

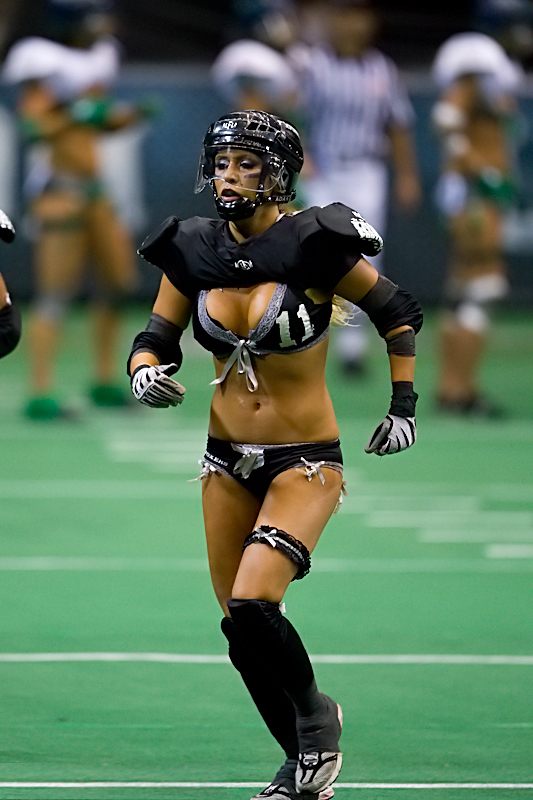
Niki Gahzian of the Temptation, November 2009

In 2009, the event organizers launched the concept as a full league called the Lingerie Football League (LFL), culminating in the Lingerie Bowl as the championship game between the conference champions, still during the Super Bowl halftime. The Temptation were one of the ten teams to participate in the inaugural 2009–10 LFL season, with one game indoors at the Los Angeles Memorial Sports Arena and one outdoors at Los Angeles Memorial Coliseum. The Temptation won the Western Conference and then defeated the Eastern Conference champion Chicago Bliss by the score of 27–14 in Lingerie Bowl VII. They played both their 2010–11 LFL season home games at the Coliseum before moving to Ontario, California, and indoors at Citizens Business Bank Arena in 2011. The Temptation won the all three Lingerie Bowls after the launch of the LFL.

Following the 2011–12 LFL season, the league rebranded as the Legends Football League and shifted away from the Super Bowl halftime event, changing its championship game to the Legends Cup. The league also shifted the season to a spring and summer schedule that launched in 2013. In 2013 and 2014, the Temptation continued to play at Citizens Business Bank Arena. In 2015, the league placed the Las Vegas Sin at the arena after the Sin lost their home venue and the Temptation moved back to the outdoor Los Angeles Memorial Coliseum, but returned to Ontario in 2016. The Temptation never made it to the Legends Cup until 2019, the last LFL season played.

On December 13, 2019, the LFL announced that it would not be producing a 2020 season and would re-evaluate markets in the future. Four days later, the Extreme Football League (X League) was announced to begin play in April 2020 with all previous LFL references redirecting to the new entity. The league size remained at eight teams, initially all in the same markets as the former LFL teams, but under new team branding and the Temptation were replaced by the Los Angeles Black Storm.

== Notable players and coaches ==
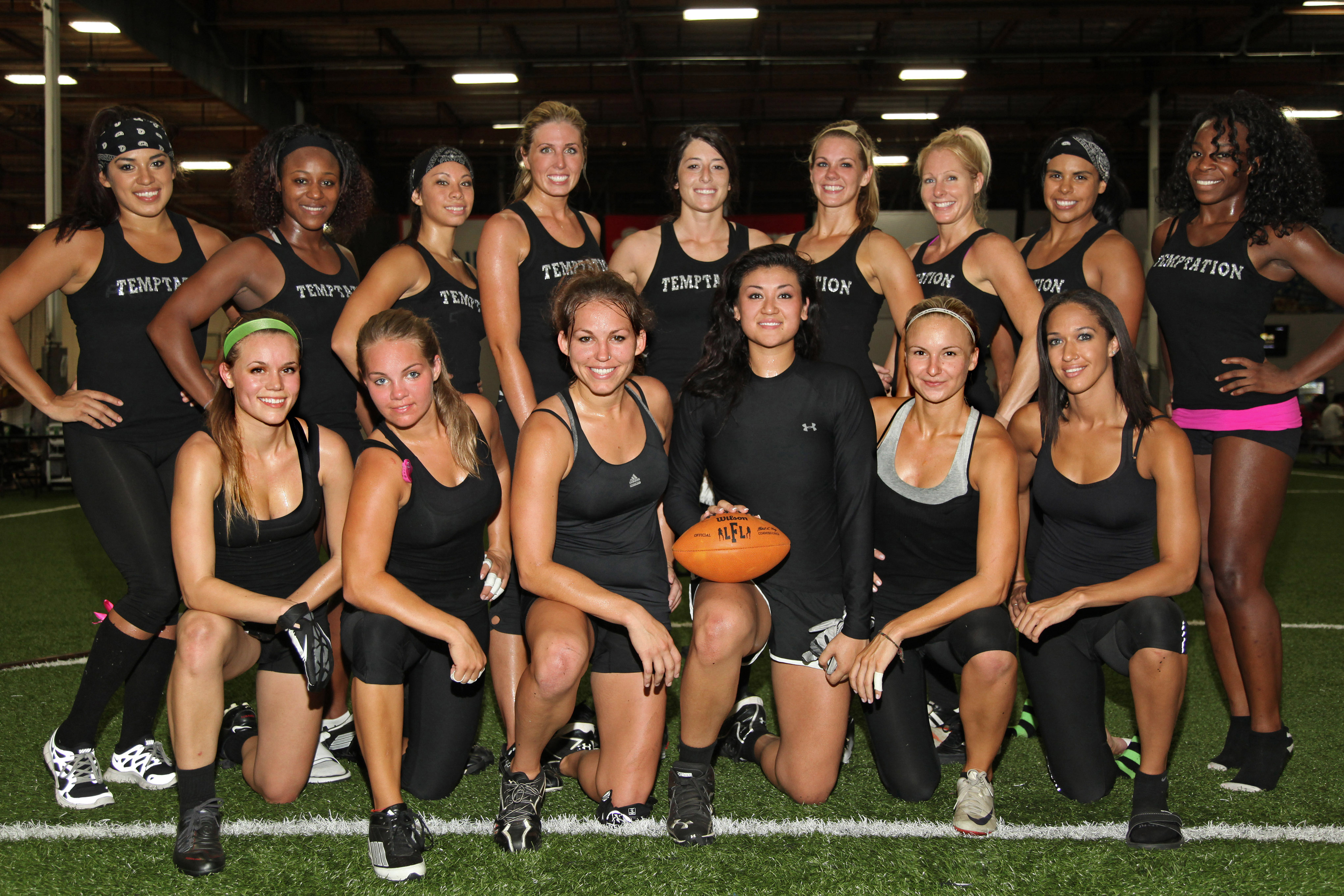
Los Angeles Temptation during practice, August 2012

- Eric Dickerson – 2004 head coach
- Katie Lohmann – 2006 quarterback
- Jim McMahon – 2006 head coach
- Deanna Merryman – 2005 player
- Cora Skinner – 2006 player
- Tamara Witmer – 2005 team captain
- Nikki Ziering – 2004 team captain
