= H-E-B Center at Cedar Park =

Indoor arena in Cedar Park, Texas, U.S.

H-E-B Center

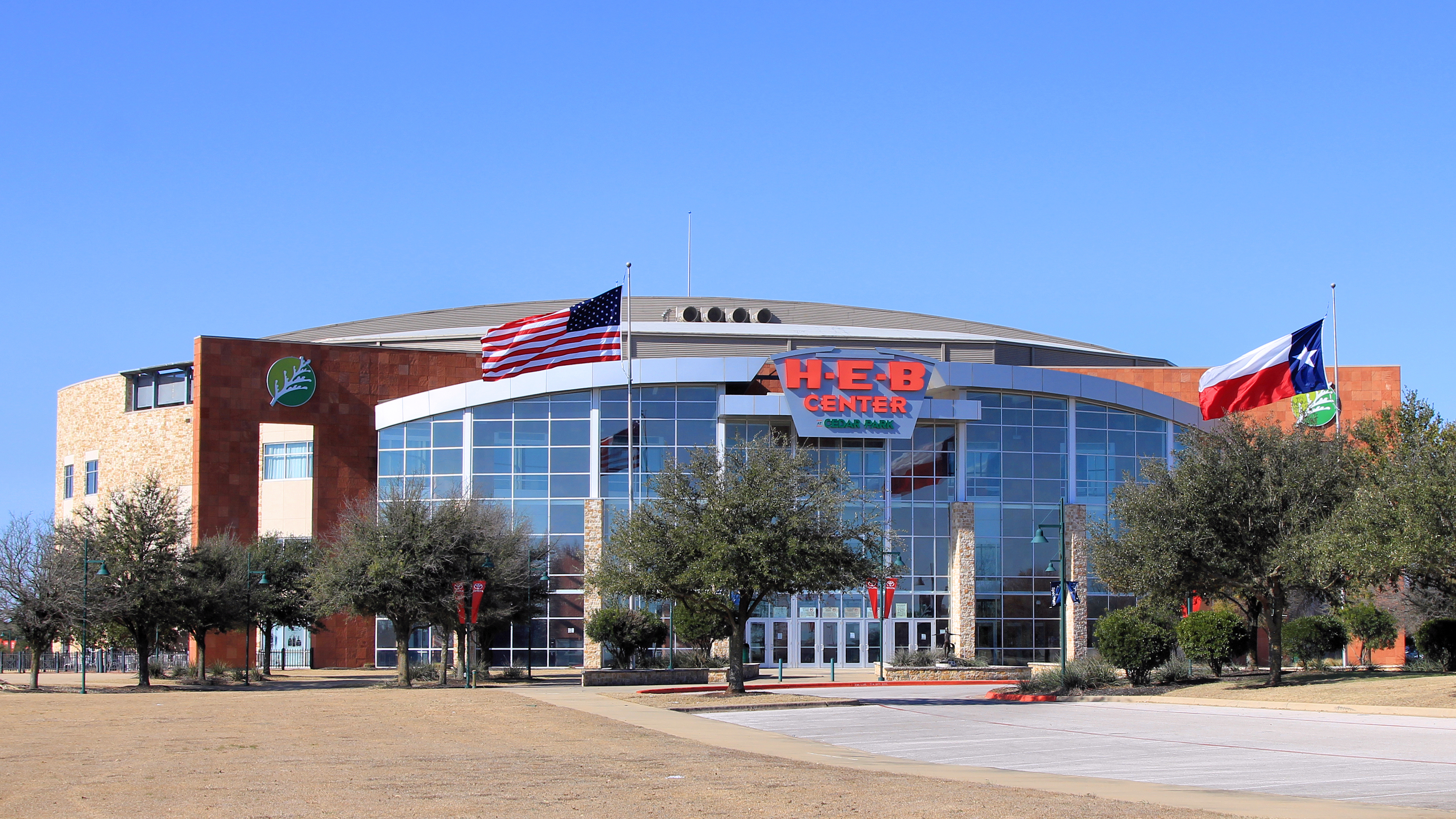
- Exterior of venue

- Location within Texas Location within the United States
- Full name: H-E-B Center at Cedar Park
- Former names: Cedar Park Center (2009–2016)
- Address: 2100 Avenue of the Stars
- Location: Cedar Park, Texas, U.S.
- Coordinates: 30.5414°N 97.8202°W
- Owner: City of Cedar Park
- Operator: Texas Stars LP
- Capacity: 8,700; Ice hockey: 6,778

Construction
- Groundbreaking: June 10, 2008
- Opened: September 25, 2009
- Cost: $55 million ($82.2 million in 2025 dollars)
- Architect: Sink Combs Dethlefs
- Project managers: Frew Management Group, LLC
- Structural engineer: Moore Engineers
- Services engineers: M-E Engineers, Inc.
- General contractor: Hunt Construction Group

Tenants
- Texas Stars (AHL) (2009–present); Austin Spurs (NBAGL) (2010–present); Austin Sound (X-League) (2022); Austin Acoustic (LFL) (2016–2019); Austin Aces (WTT) (2014–2015)

Website
- hebcenter.com

H-E-B Center at Cedar Park is an indoor arena located in Cedar Park, Texas, near Austin.

Originally named the Cedar Park Center, the arena is home to the Texas Stars of the American Hockey League and the Austin Spurs of the NBA G League.

The 8,700-seat sports arena is located at the corner of 183A and New Hope Road in Cedar Park, Texas.

The city of Cedar Park owns the arena, which is operated by Texas Stars L.P., a division of Northland Properties, the owner of the Dallas Stars and Texas Stars. Since opening, the arena has hosted sporting events, concerts and high school graduations.

== History ==
Construction began in 2008, at a cost of $55 million, and the new arena was officially opened in September 2009. Various local groups led construction efforts. The building's first event took place on September 25, 2009, featuring country music artist George Strait.

On April 22, 2016, it was announced that H-E-B had acquired the naming rights for the Cedar Park Center, and renamed the facility to H-E-B Center at Cedar Park.

== Notable events ==
On February 18, 2011, the center hosted a Strikeforce MMA televised event, known as ShoMMA 14, with Lyle Beerbohm vs. Pat Healy headlining the show.

On November 11, 2018, Ozuna performed in the arena during his Aura Tour and sold over 3,000 tickets grossing over $300,000.

The center hosted an episode of AEW Dynamite on February 12, 2020, and Fyter Fest on July 14, 2021. AEW also held an events at the arena in 2022, 2024, and 2026.

On September 10, 2022, the center hosted the inaugural "X Cup", the championship game of the 2022 X League season.

The center hosted NXT The Great American Bash on July 30, 2023.

The center is set to host the 2026 US Hockey Hall of Fame Game between Michigan State and North Dakota, which will feature more first-round NHL draft picks than any previous college hockey game.
