= Accesso ShoWare Center =

Multi-use indoor arena in Kent, Washington

accesso ShoWare Center
- The Show
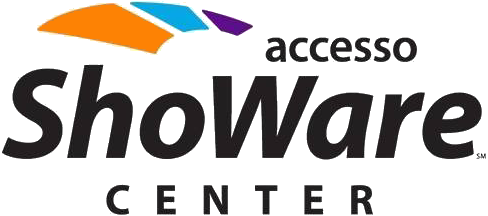

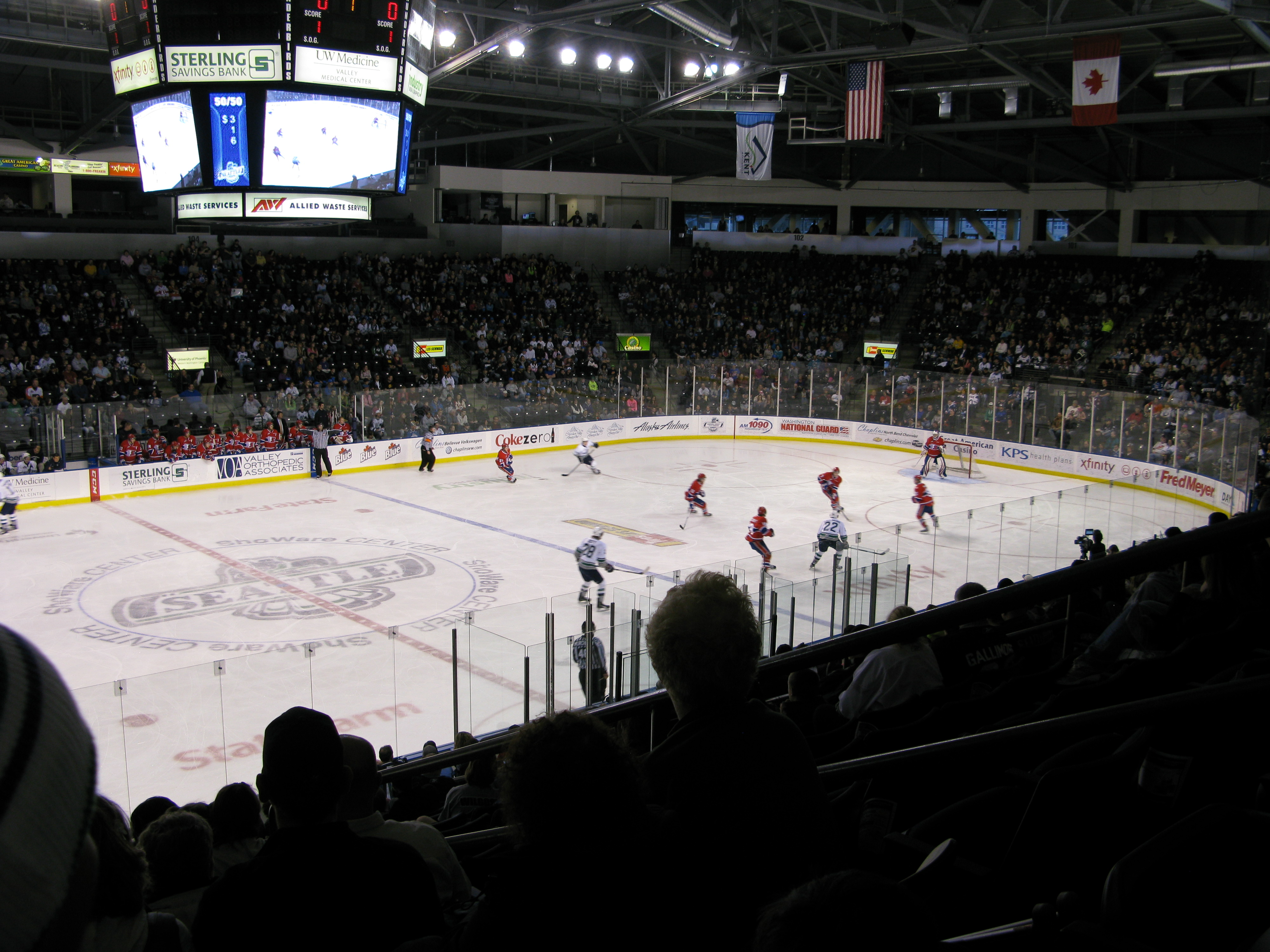
- Arena bowl (c. 2012)

- Location in the United States Location in Washington
- Interactive map of accesso ShoWare Center
- Former names: Kent Events Center (planning/construction); Amiga Center (planning/construction); ShoWare Center (2009–2017)
- Address: 625 W. James Street
- Location: Kent, Washington, U.S.
- Coordinates: 47°23′18″N 122°14′24″W
- Owner: City of Kent
- Operator: ASM Global
- Capacity: 7,141
- Current use: Ice hockey Indoor soccer Concerts

Construction
- Groundbreaking: September 25, 2007
- Opened: January 2, 2009; 17 years ago
- Cost: $84.5 million
- Architects: LMN Architects; PBK Architects
- Project managers: Shiels Obletz Johnsen, Inc.
- Structural engineer: Magnusson Klemencic Associates
- Services engineers: Wood Harbinger, Inc.
- General contractor: Mortenson Construction

Tenant
- List: Seattle Thunderbirds (WHL) (2009–present); Seattle Thunder (X League) (2022–present); Tacoma Stars (MASL) (2015–present); Seattle Mist (LFL) (2009–19); Rat City Rollergirls (WFTDA) (2009–21); Kent Predators (IFL) (2010–11); Seattle Impact (MASL) (2014–15)

Website
- accessoshowarecenter.com

The accesso ShoWare Center is a multi-purpose arena in the Northwestern United States, located in Kent, Washington, a suburb south of Seattle. It is primarily used for ice hockey and indoor soccer games, and concerts.

== History ==
Construction began in September 2007, and the venue opened in January 2009. The principal tenants are the Seattle Thunderbirds of the Western Hockey League (WHL) and the Tacoma Stars of the Major Arena Soccer League (MASL).

Naming rights to the arena were initially sold to Amiga, Inc. and the arena was to be called the "Amiga Center". However, Amiga failed to make a promised down payment, and lost the naming rights as of August 2007. In November 2008, the Kent City Council announced that the city had sold the naming rights to the Fresno-based VisionOne, Inc., an e-business software developer which in turn named the arena after ShoWare, its flagship box office operations program. In 2014, tech company Accesso purchased VisionOne, Inc.; with the venue changing its name to the accesso ShoWare Center in the fall of 2017.

The design architect is LMN Architects of Seattle, in association with PBK Architects of Vancouver, British Columbia. The arena is managed and operated by Philadelphia-based SMG.

Among other events, it hosted the 2012 edition of the Hilton HHonors Skate America.

In 2021, the ShoWare Center began a $5 million renovation to the arena, including a $800,000 scoreboard, which was completed early in the 2021-22 season. More additions to this renovation include a new cover for the ice while not in use, concession stand rebrands, the improving of the outdoor marquee, replacement of folding chairs, kitchens and other concession equipment, new stage and blackout curtains, and ice making equipment. Smaller improvements include new carpets in administrative offices, a stronger transformer to be used during concerts, motors for the curtains, the refinishing and repairing of the basketball court, repairing of fences and gates, and 40 new televisions for the suites.

== Facts about the venue ==
Miscellaneous

- The approximate square footage of the arena is 150,000 sq ft (14,000 m^{2})
- The new scoreboard built in 2021 includes two ribbon boards, the top board measuring 21'4" x 3'3", the bottom measuring 18'10" x 2'6". The four main replay screens measure 18'10" x 10'8".
- The venue opened on January 3, 2009 with a hockey game by (Seattle Thunderbirds vs. Everett Silvertips)
- The arena has a capacity of 5,887 seats. Retractable seating to provide additional space for concerts, basketball, shows and other events, expanding the capacity to 7,141.
- The venue typically hosts 110 to 117 events annually, including about 40 Thunderbird games.
- Country duo Florida Georgia Line drew an audience 7,129 people on December 14, 2013.
- The 2 millionth guest celebration was held on November 11, 2014.

Sports

- Brenden Silvester of the Seattle Thunderbirds scored the first goal in the history of the arena, in the 2nd period on January 3, 2009 against the Everett Silvertips in a 4-3 Seattle win.
- Greg Scott of the Seattle Thunderbirds scored the first hat trick in the arena on February 6, 2009
- The 2015-2016 hockey season reached an all time attendance record with an average of 4,792 people per game.
- Hockey single game attendance record of 6,223 set on May 12, 2017 during the WHL finals against the Regina Pats.
- Hosted first professional basketball games during the 2018 JBA season.
- In Professional Wrestling, the arena has hosted three house shows for the TNA Wrestling promotion (2009, 2011, 2012), one taped event for Ring of Honor wrestling's weekly television program (2019), an episode of AEW Dynamite and two episodes of AEW Collision (2025).
- The arena hosted a National Hockey League preseason game between the Seattle Kraken and Calgary Flames on October 2, 2021.

== Selected events ==
List of selected events held at the accesso ShoWare Center
Date	Artist	Event	Opening act(s)	Attendance	Revenue
November 19, 2016	Amy Grant; Michael W. Smith	Christmas with Amy Grant & Michael W. Smith	Jordan Smith	5,986 / 5,986	$329,078
December 7, 2016	Hunter Hayes; Josh Turner	Hometown Holiday	Tyler Farr; Maddie & Tae; Seth Ennis	3,481 / 3,498	$150,520
April 12, 2017	Banda MS	Gira Es Tuyo Mi Amor	Pancho Barraza; Beatriz Solís	6,521 / 6,521	$390,210
June 18, 2017	El Fantasma	Rancheando En La Ciudad Tour	Voz de Mando; Kanales	1,890 / 6,439	$121,350
July 13, 2017	Logic	Everybody's Tour	Joey Badass; Big Lenbo	4,612 / 4,937	$204,643
October 15, 2017	Los Inquietos del Norte	Gira Locos y Entumecidos	Chuy Lizárraga; Jesús Ojeda; El Filly	2,796 / 6,614	$142,955
October 29, 2017	Skillet	Unleashed Tour	Britt Nicole; Colton Dixon; Tauren Wells	1,891 / 4,432	$55,162
March 3, 2018	G-Eazy	The Beautiful & Damned Tour	Trippie Redd; Phora; Anthony Russo	6,656 / 6,820	$264,543

Preceded by KeyArena	Home of the Seattle Thunderbirds; 2009–present	Succeeded by current
