= Atlanta Steam =

Women's American football team

Logo

General information
- Founded: 2012
- Folded: 2019
- Stadium: Infinite Energy Arena
- Headquartered: Duluth, Georgia
- Colors: Black, red
- Website: www.lflus.com/atlantasteam

League / conference affiliations
- Legends Football League; Eastern Conference

The Atlanta Steam were a women's American football team of the Legends Football League (LFL) based in Duluth, Georgia, a Gwinnett County suburb of Atlanta, with home games at the Infinite Energy Arena. The Steam was the league's 14th team and played its first season in 2013.

The Steam were announced in 2008 as one of the 10 teams for the LFL's inaugural 2009–10 season, but reportedly had issues with finding a venue. The team was then reported to be moving to Charlotte, North Carolina, but that team did not launch in 2009 either.

LFL's Atlanta franchise originally began as the proposed St. Louis Saints. The team name was selected by fans in a vote. Team tryouts took place on June 24, 2012, at the Vetta Sports Club Soccerdome. Among the people trying out was former soccer player and 2006 Atlantic 10 Conference Rookie of the Year and 2008 St. Louis University leading scorer Julia Brandenburg. After negotiations to use the Family Arena fell through, the LFL suspended the Saints indefinitely, and they were replaced by a new Atlanta team. In its first game, the Steam was shut out by the Jacksonville Breeze, 48–0.

Following the 2019 season, the LFL ceased operations and relaunched as the Extreme Football League (X League), which first played in 2022. All former LFL teams received new brands and the Steam were replaced by the Atlanta Empire.
