= 2013 LFL US season =

2013 LFL United States
- Duration: March 30, 2013 – August 10, 2013

Legends Cup
- Date: September 1, 2013
- Venue: Orleans Arena, Las Vegas
- Champions: Chicago Bliss

Seasons
- 2012 Canada 2013–14 Australia

The 2013 LFL US Season was the fourth season of LFL United States, the first in the rebranded Legends Football League, and the fifth in the combined history of that league and its predecessor, the Lingerie Football League. The season featured 12 teams in various cities across the United States. In 2012, the league decided to move to a spring and summer schedule, beginning in March, 2013. For the 2013 season the league granted two new franchises: Omaha Heart and Atlanta Steam. The Toronto Triumph was, as scheduled, realigned into the league's Canadian division, LFL Canada, for the 2012 season. The Orlando Fantasy officially suspended operations, while the Tampa Breeze relocated to Jacksonville, Florida to become the Jacksonville Breeze.

For the 2013 season, the LFL released a new division structure, splitting the twelve teams into four divisions. Opening night of the 2013 was on March 30, 2013, between Atlanta Steam and Jacksonville Breeze, while Chicago Bliss and Green Bay Chill ended the regular season on August 10, 2013. For the first time, Conference division playoffs were held on August 17, 2013 at Sears Centre in Hoffman Estates, Illinois between the No. 2 and No. 3 seeds of both the Eastern and Western Conferences, with the winners playing the No.1 seeds in the Conference Championship games on August 24, 2013 at Citizens Business Bank Arena in Ontario, California. The 2013 LFL US Legends Cup (formerly the Lingerie Bowl) was played at Orleans Arena in Las Vegas, Nevada on September 1, 2013 between the Philadelphia Passion and Chicago Bliss. The Chicago Bliss won the Legends bowl 38–14, its first championship in the LFL.

== Developments ==
In 2012, the league decided to officially move the next LFL United States season to April 2013. The league stated the reasoning behind the postponement of the schedule was to move the league to a spring and summer schedule, mirroring every other indoor American football league of the past decade, as the commissioner felt that there was greater opportunity for success in the spring; the league also stated the hiatus would allow the league offices to focus on the introductory world tours scheduled for late 2012. LFL Canada was not affected by the change and continues to play its fall 2012 schedule as originally announced. The commissioner denied the suggestion that the move was a suspension of operations. On January 10, 2013, the league announced it was abandoning its original premise as the Lingerie Football League and would rebrand as the Legends Football League, with more conventional sportswear replacing the lingerie for uniforms.

The LFL announced its first expansion team for the 2013 season would be the Omaha Heart, located in Omaha, Nebraska, playing at the Ralston Arena. This was followed by a new expansion team in Saint Charles, Missouri (serving the St. Louis metropolitan area), playing in the St. Charles Convention Center, to be known as the St. Louis Saints. However, negotiations to play at the arena fell through, with the league suspending operations of the franchise indefinitely. St. Charles officials cited the league's refusal to guarantee fixed dates and money, while the league argued that the arena did not meet requirements of a top-tier facility. On October 2, 2012, the LFL announced that Atlanta had been granted an expansion franchise to play in the 2013 LFL US season. The Atlanta Steam played its home matches at the Arena at Gwinnett Center in Duluth, Georgia.

On May 24, 2012, the LFL officially temporarily suspended operations of the Orlando Fantasy franchise for the 2013 season.

For the 2013 season, the Tampa Breeze moved to Jacksonville, Florida to become known as the Jacksonville Breeze. The move was primarily driven by the owners of the Tampa Bay Times Forum, who also own the Arena Football League team the Tampa Bay Storm, deciding not to compete with the Tampa Breeze for tickets sales now that the LFL shifted its regular season schedule to coincide with the Arena Football League schedule. The team played its home matches at Jacksonville Veterans Memorial Arena, which previously hosted the 2011 LFL US Conference Playoffs.

The Philadelphia Passion announced that it will play its home games at PPL Park in Chester, Pennsylvania for the 2013 season. PPL Park is an outdoor soccer stadium, a venue that would have not been viable in the fall given eastern Pennsylvania's weather during that season. Chicago Bliss returned to playing at the Sears Centre in Hoffman Estates, Illinois.

Due to a new divisional structure, the league expanded its playoff series to include the top three teams in each conference. The best team in each conference was awarded a first round bye, while the other divisional champions played off against the third best teams in the conference in the Divisional Playoff round. The Conference Division Playoffs were played at Sears Centre in Hoffman Estates, Illinois on Saturday, August 17. The matches were originally scheduled to be played at 1stBank Center in Denver, Colorado. The Conference Championship games were played on August 24, 2013 at Citizens Business Bank Arena in Ontario, California.

The 2013 Legends Cup (formerly the Lingerie Bowl) was played at Orleans Arena in Las Vegas, Nevada on September 1, 2013. The game was originally awarded to the city of Pittsburgh, Pennsylvania with the match to be played at Highmark Stadium. Pittsburgh has been named as an LFL expansion city for the 2014 season. However, due to higher ticket sales than the 3,000 seat Highmark could accommodate, an announcement was made June 1, 2013 that the championship game would move to PPL Park in the Philadelphia suburb of Chester, Pennsylvania On July 5, 2013 the game was once again moved to Las Vegas after the LFL and Las Vegas partners negotiated a multi-year agreement to keep the LFL US Legends Cup in Las Vegas for at least the next 3 years.

== Teams ==
2013 Teams
Eastern Conference
Northeastern Division	Arena and Location
Baltimore Charm	1st Mariner Arena (Baltimore, Maryland)
Cleveland Crush	Quicken Loans Arena (Cleveland, Ohio)
Philadelphia Passion	PPL Park (Chester, Pennsylvania)
Southeastern Division	Arena and Location
Atlanta Steam	Arena at Gwinnett Center (Duluth, Georgia)
Omaha Heart	Ralston Arena (Omaha, Nebraska)
Jacksonville Breeze	Jacksonville Veterans Memorial Arena (Jacksonville, Florida)
Western Conference
Midwestern Division	Arena and Location
Chicago Bliss	Sears Centre (Hoffman Estates, Illinois)
Green Bay Chill	Resch Center (Green Bay, Wisconsin)
Minnesota Valkyrie	Target Center (Minneapolis, Minnesota)
Pacific Division	Arena and Location
Las Vegas Sin	Orleans Arena (Las Vegas, Nevada)
Los Angeles Temptation	Citizens Business Bank Arena (Ontario, California)
Seattle Mist	ShoWare Center (Kent, Washington)

== Schedule ==
Date	Visitor	Home	Kickoff	Venue	Score	Game Recap
Regular Season
Saturday, March 30	Atlanta Steam	Jacksonville Breeze	8:00 PM ET	Jacksonville Veterans Memorial Arena	Jacksonville 48; Atlanta 0	Recap
Saturday, April 6	Green Bay Chill	Seattle Mist	8:00 PM PT	ShoWare Center	Seattle 55; Green Bay 36	Recap
Saturday, April 13	Omaha Heart	Atlanta Steam	8:00 PM ET	Arena at Gwinnett Center	Atlanta 42; Omaha 6	Recap
Friday, April 19	Los Angeles Temptation	Chicago Bliss	9:00 PM CT	Sears Centre	Los Angeles 31; Chicago 18	Recap
Saturday, April 27	Bye Week					
Saturday, May 4	Seattle Mist	Los Angeles Temptation	8:00 PM PT	Citizens Business Bank Arena	Seattle 24; Los Angeles 20	Recap
Friday, May 10	Las Vegas Sin	Chicago Bliss	9:00 PM CT	Sears Centre	Chicago 34; Las Vegas 12	Recap
Saturday, May 11	Minnesota Valkyrie	Green Bay Chill	8:00 PM CT	Resch Center	Green Bay 40; Minnesota 8	Recap
Saturday, May 18	Cleveland Crush	Atlanta Steam	8:00 PM ET	Arena at Gwinnett Center	Atlanta 49; Cleveland 40	Recap
Saturday, May 25	Baltimore Charm	Jacksonville Breeze	8:00 PM ET	Jacksonville Veterans Memorial Arena	Jacksonville 27; Baltimore 12	Recap
Saturday, June 1	Jacksonville Breeze	Omaha Heart	8:00 PM CT	Ralston Arena	Omaha 8 Jacksonville 0	Recap
Saturday, June 8	Philadelphia Passion	Baltimore Charm	8:00 PM ET	1st Mariner Arena	Baltimore 20; Philadelphia 19	Recap
Friday, June 14	Omaha Heart	Cleveland Crush	8:00 PM ET	Quicken Loans Arena	Cleveland 12; Omaha 0	Recap
Saturday, June 15	Jacksonville Breeze	Philadelphia Passion	8:00 PM ET	PPL Park	Philadelphia 21; Jacksonville 19	Recap
Saturday, June 22	Green Bay Chill	Las Vegas Sin	8:00 PM PT	Orleans Arena	Las Vegas 40; Green Bay 32	Recap
Saturday, June 29	Las Vegas Sin	Los Angeles Temptation	8:00 PM PT	Citizens Business Bank Arena	Los Angeles 42; Las Vegas 26	Recap
Saturday, July 6	Minnesota Valkyrie	Seattle Mist	8:00 PM PT	ShoWare Center	Seattle 38; Minnesota 0	Recap
Friday, July 12	Cleveland Crush	Baltimore Charm	8:00 PM ET	1st Mariner Arena	Baltimore 24; Cleveland 18	Recap
Saturday, July 13	Atlanta Steam	Philadelphia Passion	8:00 PM ET	PPL Park	Cancelled (Note: Match between Atlanta Steam and Philadelphia Passion was cancelled on July 5, 2013. Both teams were awarded a tie.)	
Saturday, July 20	Seattle Mist	Las Vegas Sin	8:00 PM PT	Orleans Arena	Seattle 52; Las Vegas 14	Recap
Friday, July 26	Chicago Bliss	Minnesota Valkyrie	8:00 PM CT	Target Center	Chicago 25; Minnesota 12	Recap
Sunday, July 28	Philadelphia Passion	Cleveland Crush	8:00 PM ET	Quicken Loans Arena	Philadelphia 33; Cleveland 26	
Saturday, August 3	Baltimore Charm	Omaha Heart	8:00 PM CT	Ralston Arena	Baltimore 12; Omaha 6	Recap
Friday, August 9	Los Angeles Temptation	Minnesota Valkyrie	8:00 PM CT	Target Center	Cancelled (Note: Match between Los Angeles Temptation and Minnesota Valkyrie was cancelled. Both teams were awarded a tie.)	
Saturday, August 10	Chicago Bliss	Green Bay Chill	8:00 PM CT	Resch Center	Chicago 27; Green Bay 18	Recap

== Playoffs ==
Date	Visitor	Home	Kickoff	Venue	City	Score	Game Recap
Conference Division Playoffs
Saturday, August 17	Philadelphia Passion	Atlanta Steam	7:00 PM CT	Sears Centre	Hoffman Estates, Illinois	Philadelphia 28; Atlanta 20	
Saturday, August 17	Los Angeles Temptation	Chicago Bliss	9:00 PM CT	Sears Centre	Hoffman Estates, Illinois	Los Angeles 12; Chicago 19	
Conference Championships
Saturday, August 24	Philadelphia Passion	Baltimore Charm	7:00 PM PT	Citizens Business Bank Arena	Ontario, California	Philadelphia 20; Baltimore 19	Recap
Saturday, August 24	Chicago Bliss	Seattle Mist	9:00 PM PT	Citizens Business Bank Arena	Ontario, California	Chicago 31; Seattle 14	
Legends Cup
Sunday, September 1	Chicago Bliss	Philadelphia Passion	7:00PM PT	Orleans Arena	Las Vegas, Nevada	Chicago 34; Philadelphia 18	Recap

Date	Visitor	Home	Kickoff	Venue	Score	Game Recap
Pacific Cup 2
Friday, December 6	Los Angeles Temptation	Seattle Mist	8:00 PM PT	ShoWare Center	Seattle 27; Los Angeles 25	

== Standings ==
=== Eastern Conference ===
Northeastern Division

Team	Wins	Loss	Ties	Pct	PF	PA	Net Pts	TD's	Home Record	Home Pct	Road Record	Road Pct	Conference	Conf. Pct	Conf. Streak
"*^ Baltimore Charm	3	1	0	0.750	68	70	-2	11	2-0	1.000	1-1	0.500	3-1	0.750	W3
^ Philadelphia Passion	2	1	1	0.667	73	65	8	11	1-0-1	0.750	1-1	0.500	2-1-1	0.625	W1
Cleveland Crush	1	3	0	0.250	96	106	-10	15	1-1	0.500	0-2	0.000	1-3	0.250	L2

Southeastern Division

Team	Wins	Loss	Ties	Pct	PF	PA	Net Pts	TD's	Home Record	Home Pct	Road Record	Road Pct	Conference	Conf. Pct	Conf. Streak
*^ Atlanta Steam	2	1	1	0.667	91	94	-3	13	2-0	1.000	0-1-1	0.250	2-1-1	0.625	T1
Jacksonville Breeze	2	2	0	0.500	94	41	53	14	2-0	1.000	0-2	0.000	2-2	0.500	L2
Omaha Heart	1	3	0	0.250	20	66	-46	3	1-1	0.500	0-2	0.000	1-3	0.250	L2

=== Western Conference ===
Midwestern Division

Team	Wins	Loss	Ties	Pct	PF	PA	Net Pts	TD's	Home Record	Home Pct	Road Record	Road Pct	Conference	Conf. Pct	Conf. Streak
*^ Chicago Bliss	3	1	0	0.750	104	44	16	8	1-1	0.500	2-0	1.000	3-1	0.750	W3
Green Bay Chill	1	3	0	0.250	126	130	-4	19	1-1	0.500	0-2	0.000	1-3	0.250	W1
Minnesota Valkyrie	0	3	1	0.000	20	103	-83	3	0-1-1	0.000	0-2	0.000	0-3-1	0.000	L3

Pacific Division

Team	Wins	Loss	Ties	Pct	PF	PA	Net Pts	TD's	Home Record	Home Pct	Road Record	Road Pct	Conference	Conf. Pct	Conf. Streak
"*^ Seattle Mist	4	0	0	1.000	169	70	99	25	2-0	1.000	2-0	1.000	4-0	1.000	W4
^ Los Angeles Temptation	2	1	1	0.667	93	68	25	13	1-1	0.500	1-0-1	1.000	2-1	0.667	W1
Las Vegas Sin	1	3	0	0.250	92	160	-68	14	1-1	0.500	0-2	0.000	1-3	0.250	L2

* conference champion, " division winner, ^ clinched playoff berth

== Awards ==
League MVP

- Anne Erler - Green Bay Chill
- Laurel Creel - Seattle Mist
- Ashley Salerno - Los Angeles Temptation
- Adrian Purnell - Jacksonville Breeze
- Heather Furr - Chicago Bliss
- Chrisdell Harris - Chicago Bliss

Offensive Player of the Year

- Anna Heasman - Green Bay Chill
- Anne Erler - Green Bay Chill
- Chrisdell Harris - Chicago Bliss
- Ashley Salerno - Los Angeles Temptation
- Nikki Johnson - Las Vegas Sin

Defensive Player of the Year

- Adrian Purnell - Jacksonville Breeze
- Cassandra Strickland - Las Vegas Sin
- Saige Steinmetz - Jacksonville Breeze
- Theresa Petruziello - Cleveland Crush
- Kym Jack - Baltimore Charm

Rookie of the Year

- Kelley Schroeder - Las Vegas Sin
- Shuree Hyatt - Seattle Mist
- Anna Heasman - Green Bay Chill
- Alli Alberts - Chicago Bliss
- Meagan Larson - Philadelphia Passion

Mortaza Award

- Jessica Hopkins - Seattle Mist
- Kelly Campbell - Baltimore Charm
- Monique Gaxiola - Los Angeles Temptation
- Angela Rypien - Baltimore Charm
- Brittany Morgan - Atlanta Steam

Most Improved Player

- Angela Rypien - Baltimore Charm
- Laurel Creel - Seattle Mist
- Danika Brace - Las Vegas Sin
- Jasmine Byndloss - Los Angeles Temptation
- Kelly Campbell - Baltimore Charm

Coach of the Year

- Chris Michaelson - Seattle Mist
- Gilbert Brown - Green Bay Chill
- Keith Hac - Chicago Bliss
- Dontae Allen - Omaha Heart
- Gary Clark - Baltimore Charm

Team of the Year

- Los Angeles Temptation
- Seattle Mist
- Baltimore Charm
- Omaha Heart
- Chicago Bliss

Legends Cup MVP

- Heather Furr - Chicago Bliss

8th Man Award (Best Fan Base)

- Baltimore Charm
- Omaha Heart
- Seattle Mist
- Los Angeles Temptation
- Green Bay Chill

LFL Awards Winners
