= 2014 LFL US season =

2014 LFL United States
- Duration: April 12, 2014 – August 9, 2014

Legends Cup
- Date: September 1, 2014
- Venue: Citizens Business Bank Arena, Ontario, California
- Champions: Chicago Bliss

Seasons
- ← 2013–14 Australia 2015 US →

The 2014 LFL US Season was the fifth season of LFL United States, the second in the rebranded Legends Football League, and the seventh in the combined history of that league and its predecessor, the Lingerie Football League. The season featured 10 teams in various cities across the United States.

== Teams ==
2014 Teams
Eastern Conference
Baltimore Charm	1st Mariner Arena (Baltimore, Maryland)
Toledo Crush	Huntington Center (Toledo, Ohio)
Atlanta Steam	Arena at Gwinnett Center (Duluth, Georgia)
Omaha Heart	Ralston Arena (Omaha, Nebraska)
Jacksonville Breeze	Jacksonville Veterans Memorial Arena (Jacksonville, Florida)
Western Conference
Chicago Bliss	Sears Centre (Hoffman Estates, Illinois)
Green Bay Chill	U.S. Cellular Arena (Milwaukee, Wisconsin)
Las Vegas Sin	Thomas & Mack Center (Las Vegas, Nevada)
Los Angeles Temptation	Citizens Business Bank Arena (Ontario, California)
Seattle Mist	ShoWare Center (Kent, Washington)

== Schedule ==
Date	Visitor	Home	Kickoff	Venue	Score	Game Recap
Regular Season
Saturday, April 5	Chicago Bliss	Green Bay Chill	8:00 PM CT	U.S. Cellular Arena	Rescheduled to Saturday; July 12	
Saturday, April 12	Jacksonville Breeze	Baltimore Charm	8:00 PM ET	1st Mariner Arena	Jacksonville 27; Baltimore 12	
Saturday, April 19	Omaha Heart	Jacksonville Breeze	8:00 PM ET	Veterans Memorial Arena	Jacksonville 25; Omaha 0	
Saturday, April 26	Las Vegas Sin	Los Angeles Temptation	8:00 PM PT	Citizens Business Bank Arena	Los Angeles 42; Las Vegas 14	
Friday, May 2	Green Bay Chill	Seattle Mist	9:00 PM PT	ShoWare Center	Seattle 38; Green Bay 24	
Friday, May 9	Los Angeles Temptation	Chicago Bliss	9:00 PM CT	Sears Centre Arena	Chicago 25; Los Angeles 21	
Saturday, May 10	Atlanta Steam	Toledo Crush	8:00 PM ET	Huntington Center	Rescheduled to Friday; July 11	
Thursday, May 15	Green Bay Chill	Las Vegas Sin	8:00 PM PT	Thomas & Mack Center	Las Vegas 34; Green Bay 24	
Saturday, May 24	Bye Week					
Saturday, May 31	Toledo Crush	Jacksonville Breeze	8:00 PM PT	Veterans Memorial Arena	Cancelled	
Saturday, June 7	Omaha Heart	Atlanta Steam	8:00 PM ET	The Arena at Gwinnett Center	Atlanta 20; Omaha 13	
Friday, June 13	Seattle Mist	Chicago Bliss	9:00 PM CT	Sears Centre Arena	Seattle 34; Chicago 34	
Saturday, June 14	Los Angeles Temptation	Green Bay Chill		U.S. Cellular Arena	Cancelled	
Saturday, June 21	Baltimore Charm	Toledo Crush	8:00 PM ET	Huntington Center	Baltimore 54; Toledo 27	
Saturday, June 28	Atlanta Steam	Baltimore Charm	8:oo PM ET	1st Mariner Arena	Cancelled	
Saturday, July 3	Chicago Bliss	Las Vegas Sin	8:00 PM PT	Thomas & Mack Center	Chicago 27; Las Vegas 18	
Friday, July 11	Atlanta Steam	Toledo Crush	8:00 PM ET	Huntington Center	Atlanta 40; Toledo 13	
Saturday, July 12	Chicago Bliss	Green Bay Chill	8:00 PM CT	U.S. Cellular Arena	Chicago 32; Green Bay 7	
Friday, July 18	Toledo Crush	Omaha Heart	9:00 PM CT	Ralston Arena	Omaha 31; Toledo 0	
Saturday, July 26	Las Vegas Sin	Seattle Mist	8:00 PM PT	ShoWare Center	Seattle 29; Las Vegas 18	
Saturday, August 2	Seattle Mist	Los Angeles Temptation	8:00 PM PT	Citizens Business Bank Arena	Los Angeles 34; Seattle 12	
Saturday, August 9	Baltimore Charm	Omaha Heart	8:00 PM CT	Ralston Arena	Omaha 19; Baltimore 12	

== Playoffs ==
Date	Visitor	Home	Kickoff	Venue	City	Score	Game Recap
Conference Championships
Saturday, August 16	Jacksonville Breeze	Atlanta Steam	8:00 PM ET	The Arena at Gwinnett Center	Duluth, Georgia	Atlanta 20; Jacksonville 14	
Saturday, August 23	Los Angeles Temptation	Chicago Bliss	8:00 PM PT	Citizens Business Bank Arena	Ontario, California	Chicago 40; Los Angeles 12	
Legends Cup
Saturday, September 6	Atlanta Steam	Chicago Bliss	7:00PM PT	Citizens Business Bank Arena	Ontario, California	Atlanta 18; Chicago 24	

== Standings ==
=== Eastern Conference ===
Team	Wins	Loss	Ties	Pct	PF	PA	Net Pts	TD's	Home Record	Home Pct	Road Record	Road Pct	Streak
*^ Atlanta Steam	3	1	1	0.750	98	69	29	14	2-0	1.000	1-1	0.500	L1
^Jacksonville Breeze	2	1	1	0.667	66	32	34	10	1-0	1.000	1-1	0.500	L1
Omaha Heart	2	2	0	0.500	63	57	6	11	2-0	1.000	0-2	0.000	W2
Baltimore Charm	1	2	1	0.333	78	73	6	13	0-1	0.000	1-1	0.500	L1
Toledo Crush	0	3	1	0.000	40	145	-105	6	0-2	0.000	0-1	0.000	L3

=== Western Conference ===
Team	Wins	Loss	Ties	Pct	PF	PA	Net Pts	TD's	Home Record	Home Pct	Road Record	Road Pct	Streak
*^ Chicago Bliss	5	0	1	1.000	182	110	72	28	1-0-1	1.000	4-0	1.000	W5
Seattle Mist	2	1	1	0.750	113	112	1	16	2-0	1.000	0-1-1	0.000	L1
^Los Angeles Temptation	2	2	1	0.500	111	91	20	16	2-1	0.667	0-1-1	0.000	L1
Las Vegas Sin	1	3	0	.250	84	122	-38	13	1-1	0.500	0-2	0.000	L3
Green Bay Chill	0	3	1	0.000	55	104	-49	6	0-1	0.000	0-2	0.000	L3

* conference champion, ^ clinched playoff berth

== 2014 Legends Cup ==
The 2014 Legends Cup featured the defending champion Chicago Bliss versus the Atlanta Steam. Chicago came into the game a 20-point favorite. The Bliss scored first to take the 8-0 lead but Atlanta came back before the half to make the score 8-6 at the break. Chicago opened their lead 16-6 on the final play of the third quarter. Atlanta continued to remain close but Chicago never surrendered the lead, holding on to win the game 24-18 and capture their second consecutive Legends Cup championship. Chicago running back Chrisdell Harris was named MVP of the game.

== Awards ==
League MVP

- Danika Brace - Las Vegas Sin
- Saige Steinmetz - Jacksonville Breeze
- Chrisdell Harris - Chicago Bliss
- Stevi Schnoor - Seattle Mist

Offensive Player of the Year

- Sindy Cummings - Las Vegas Sin
- Chrisdell Harris - Chicago Bliss
- Markie Henderson - Las Vegas Sin
- Saige Steinmetz - Jacksonville Breeze

Defensive Player of the Year

- Danika Brace - Las Vegas Sin
- Jessica Hopkins - Seattle Mist
- Lily Granston - Seattle Mist
- Theresa Petruziello - Omaha Heart

Rookie of the Year

- Sindy Cummings - Las Vegas Sin
- Lily Granston - Seattle Mist
- Dakota Hughes - Atlanta Steam
- Markie Henderson - Las Vegas Sin

Mortaza Award

- Dakota Hughes - Atlanta Steam
- Danika Brace - Las Vegas Sin
- Ogom Chijindu - Los Angeles Temptation
- Carmen Bourseau - Los Angeles Temptation

Coach of the Year

- Dane Robinson - Atlanta Steam
- Eddie Chan - Los Angeles Temptation
- Keith Hac - Chicago Bliss
- Tui Suiaunoa - Las Vegas Sin

Team of the Year

- Atlanta Steam
- Los Angeles Temptation
- Chicago Bliss
- Las Vegas Sin

8th Man Award (Best Fan Base)

- Seattle Mist
- Chicago Bliss
- Omaha Heart
- Atlanta Steam

Legends Cup MVP

- Chrisdell Harris - Chicago Bliss

LFL USA 2014 Nominees
