= 2011–12 LFL season =

- Duration: July 30, 2011 – January 21, 2012
- Eastern Champions champions: Philadelphia Passion
- Western Champions champions: Los Angeles Temptation

Lingerie Bowl IX
- Date: February 5, 2012
- Venue: Orleans Arena, Las Vegas
- Champions: Los Angeles Temptation

Seasons
- 2010-11 US 2012 Canada

The 2011-12 LFL Season was the third season of the Lingerie Football League. The league features 12 teams in various cities across the United States and Canada. For the 2011–2012 season the League granted five new franchises: Cleveland Crush, Green Bay Chill, Las Vegas Sin, Minnesota Valkyrie and Toronto Triumph. Dallas Desire has suspended operations for the 2011-2012 season with a planned return in 2012-2013. The stated reasons were financial and issues with the commitment of players on and off the field. The statuses of the Miami Caliente and San Diego Seduction are unknown; they are no longer included on the LFL's list of teams and are not included in the 2011-2012 schedule, but no suspension of operations has been publicly indicated. The Denver Dream and New York Majesty/Euphoria remain shuttered.

After two years as a professional league, the LFL ceased paying players beginning in the 2011 season, converting the league into an amateur league.

In 2011-12, MTV Networks' MTV2 channel once again broadcast 20 regular season games, two conference playoff games, and the championship game during the pre-game of the Super Bowl. This year however, they presented the games in their entirety at 9:00 PM ET. LFL Presents: LFL, Friday Night Football on MTV2 premiered on August 26, 2011 from Green Bay, Wisconsin.

The 2011 All-Fantasy Game was held in Hamilton, Ontario on July 30, 2011 at Copps Coliseum. Trailing 18-6 in the second half, the Eastern Conference rallied to win 24-18 over the Western Conference. Christy Bell, quarterback for the Philadelphia Passion, was awarded offensive MVP for her 2 touchdown passes, while Liz Gorman, a safety with the Tampa Breeze, was named defensive MVP. The city of Hamilton lost at least $50,000 hosting the game, which drew an estimated crowd of "a few thousand" that only filled approximately half of the lower bowl of the arena, even after ticket prices were slashed to $10 per ticket.

The season kicked off on August 26, 2011 and culminated with Lingerie Bowl IX on February 4, 2012. The LFL Eastern and Western Conference Playoff games were played back-to-back on January 28, 2012 at Citizens Business Bank Arena in Ontario, California. Los Angeles Temptation won its third straight Western Conference Championship while Philadelphia Passion won the Eastern Conference Championship, its second in a row, to set up a rematch of last season's Lingerie Bowl. The 2012 Lingerie Bowl was played during the pre-match of Super Bowl XLVI at Orleans Arena in Paradise, Nevada. Los Angeles Temptation won its third consecutive Lingerie Bowl with a 28 - 6 victory over Philadelphia Passion. The Temptation's Ashley Salerno and Amber Reed were co-MVP's, with Salerno throwing three touchdown passes and Reed scoring two rushing touchdowns.

== Expansion and contraction ==
On November 10, 2010, it was announced that Oklahoma City would be receiving an expansion franchise for the 2011–12 season, only to be publicly rejected by the city's mayor, who said he would not allow the league to operate in the city.

On December 6, 2010, it was announced that Cleveland, Ohio beat out Columbus, Ohio for the newest franchise. In the 2011–12 season, the Cleveland Crush began play at Quicken Loans Arena in downtown Cleveland.

On December 8, 2010, it was announced that a Las Vegas expansion side, to be known as the Las Vegas Sin, would begin play for the 2011–12 season.

On January 25, 2011, the league announced an expansion team would be awarded to Green Bay, Wisconsin in the fall of 2011. They would be known as the Green Bay Chill and play home games at Resch Center.

On March 17, 2011, the LFL announced that the Dallas Desire would be suspended for the 2011-2012 season with a planned return in 2012-2013. The stated reasons were financial and issues with the commitment of players on and off the field.

On March 23, 2011, the LFL announced a franchise to Minneapolis for the 2011 season. The team would be known as the Minnesota Valkyrie and play at Target Center in downtown Minneapolis (home of the NBA's Minnesota Timberwolves).

On April 12, 2011, the LFL announced that they would have a franchise in Toronto, Ontario. This was the first franchise outside of the United States. Their games would be played in the Ricoh Coliseum where the American Hockey League's Toronto Marlies play.

The status of the San Diego Seduction is unknown; they are no longer included on the LFL's list of teams, but no suspension of operations has been publicly indicated. The Miami Caliente folded.

== Teams ==
2011–2012 Teams
Eastern Conference	Arena and Location
Baltimore Charm	1st Mariner Arena (Baltimore, Maryland)
Cleveland Crush	Quicken Loans Arena (Cleveland, Ohio)
Orlando Fantasy	UCF Arena (Orlando, Florida)
Philadelphia Passion	Sun National Bank Center (Trenton, New Jersey)
Tampa Breeze	St. Pete Times Forum (Tampa, Florida)
Toronto Triumph	Ricoh Coliseum (Toronto, Ontario)
Western Conference	Arena and Location
Chicago Bliss	Toyota Park (Bridgeview, Illinois)
Green Bay Chill	Resch Center (Green Bay, Wisconsin)
Las Vegas Sin	Orleans Arena (Paradise, Nevada)
Los Angeles Temptation	Citizens Business Bank Arena (Ontario, California)
Minnesota Valkyrie	Target Center (Minneapolis, Minnesota)
Seattle Mist	ShoWare Center (Kent, Washington)

== Schedule ==
Date	Visitor	Home	Kickoff	Venue	Score	Game Recap
2011 All-Fantasy Game
July 30, 2011	Western Conference	Eastern Conference	9:00 PM ET	Copps Coliseum	East 24 West 18	Recap
Regular Season
August 26, 2011	Minnesota Valkyrie	Green Bay Chill	9:00 PM CT	Resch Center	Minnesota 28 Green Bay 25	Recap
September 2, 2011	Las Vegas Sin	Chicago Bliss	9:00 PM CT	Toyota Park	Las Vegas 32 Chicago 20	Recap
September 9, 2011	Tampa Breeze	Philadelphia Passion	10:00 PM ET	Sun National Bank Center	Philadelphia 48 Tampa 0	Recap
September 16, 2011	Orlando Fantasy	Baltimore Charm	10:00 PM ET	1st Mariner Arena	Orlando 36 Baltimore 12	Recap
September 17, 2011	Tampa Breeze	Toronto Triumph	8:00 PM ET	Ricoh Coliseum	Tampa 48 Toronto 14	Recap
September 23, 2011	Baltimore Charm	Cleveland Crush	10:00 PM ET	Quicken Loans Arena	Baltimore 20 Cleveland 19	Recap
September 30, 2011	Seattle Mist	Green Bay Chill	9:00 PM CT	Resch Center	Seattle 42 Green Bay 8	Recap
October 7, 2011	Green Bay Chill	Chicago Bliss	9:00 PM CT	Toyota Park	Green Bay 36 Chicago 34	Recap
October 14, 2011	Los Angeles Temptation	Minnesota Valkyrie	9:00 PM CT	Target Center	Los Angeles 28 Minnesota 7	Recap
October 21, 2011	Cleveland Crush	Tampa Breeze	10:00 PM ET	St. Pete Times Forum	Tampa 31 Cleveland 29	Recap
October 28, 2011	Baltimore Charm	Toronto Triumph	10:00 PM ET	Ricoh Coliseum	Baltimore 42 Toronto 6	Recap
October 29, 2011	Philadelphia Passion	Cleveland Crush	8:00 PM ET	Quicken Loans Arena	Philadelphia 60 Cleveland 18	Recap
November 4, 2011	Las Vegas Sin	Seattle Mist	7:00 PM PT	ShoWare Center	Las Vegas 28 Seattle 24	Recap
November 11, 2011	Los Angeles Temptation	Las Vegas Sin	9:00 PM PT	Orleans Arena	Las Vegas 28 Los Angeles 20	Recap
November 18, 2011	Philadelphia Passion	Baltimore Charm	9:00 PM ET	1st Mariner Arena	Philadelphia 24 Baltimore 12	Recap
November 19, 2011	Chicago Bliss	Minnesota Valkyrie	8:00 PM CT	Target Center	Chicago 40 Minnesota 33	Recap
November 25, 2011	Bye Week (Thanksgiving)					
December 2, 2011	Cleveland Crush	Orlando Fantasy	9:00 PM ET	Florida Citrus Bowl	Orlando 68 Cleveland 8	Recap
December 9, 2011	Toronto Triumph	Philadelphia Passion	9:00 PM ET	Sun National Bank Center	Philadelphia 74 Toronto 0	Recap
December 16, 2011	Seattle Mist	Los Angeles Temptation	9:00 PM PT	Citizens Business Bank Arena	Los Angeles 27 Seattle 24	Recap
December 23, 2011	Bye Week (Christmas)					
December 30, 2011	Orlando Fantasy	Tampa Breeze	9:00 PM ET	St. Pete Times Forum	Tampa 20 Orlando 18	Recap
January 6, 2012	Minnesota Valkyrie	Seattle Mist	9:00 PM PT	ShoWare Center	Seattle 32 Minnesota 14	Recap
January 13, 2012	Toronto Triumph	Orlando Fantasy	9:00 PM ET	Florida Citrus Bowl	Orlando 49 Toronto 18	Recap
January 20, 2012	Chicago Bliss	Los Angeles Temptation	9:00 PM PT	Citizens Business Bank Arena	Los Angeles 42 Chicago 26	Recap
January 21, 2012	Green Bay Chill	Las Vegas Sin	8:00 PM PT	Orleans Arena	Las Vegas 30 Green Bay 0	Recap

== Playoffs ==
Date	Visitor	Home	Kickoff	Venue	Score	Game Recap
Eastern Conference Championship
January 29, 2012	Tampa Breeze (2)	Philadelphia Passion (1)	4:00 PM ET	Citizens Business Bank Arena	Philadelphia 44 Tampa Bay 32	Recap
Western Conference Championship
January 29, 2012	Los Angeles Temptation (2)	Las Vegas Sin (1)	5:30 PM ET	Citizens Business Bank Arena	Los Angeles 27 Las Vegas 18	Recap
Lingerie Bowl IX
February 5, 2012	Los Angeles Temptation (W2)	Philadelphia Passion (E1)	4:00 PM ET	Orleans Arena, Paradise	Los Angeles 28 Philadelphia 6	Recap

== Standings ==
=== Eastern Conference ===
Team	Wins	Loss	Ties	Pct	PF	PA	Net Pts	TD's	Home Record	Home Pct	Road Record	Road Pct	Conference	Conf. Pct	Conf. Streak
* Philadelphia Passion	4	0	0	1.000	206	30	176	28	2-0	1.000	2-0	1.000	4-0	1.000	W4
* Tampa Breeze	3	1	0	0.750	99	109	-10	13	2-0	1.000	1-1	0.500	3-1	0.750	W3
^ Orlando Fantasy	3	1	0	0.750	171	58	113	25	2-0	1.000	1-1	0.500	3-1	0.750	W1
^ Baltimore Charm	2	2	0	0.500	86	85	1	13	0-2	0.000	2-0	1.000	2-2	0.500	L1
^ Cleveland Crush	0	4	0	0.000	74	179	-105	11	0-2	0.000	0-2	0.000	0-4	0.000	L4
^ Toronto Triumph	0	4	0	0.000	38	213	-175	6	0-2	0.000	0-2	0.000	0-2	0.000	L4

=== Western Conference ===
Team	Wins	Loss	Ties	Pct	PF	PA	Net Pts	TD's	Home Record	Home Pct	Road Record	Road Pct	Conference	Conf. Pct	Conf. Streak
* Las Vegas Sin	4	0	0	1.000	108	64	54	18	2-0	1.000	2-0	1.000	4-0	1.000	W4
* Los Angeles Temptation	3	1	0	0.750	117	85	32	18	2-0	1.000	1-1	0.500	3-1	0.750	W2
^ Seattle Mist	2	2	0	0.500	122	87	35	18	1-1	0.500	1-1	0.500	2-2	0.500	W1
^ Chicago Bliss	1	3	0	0.250	120	143	-23	18	0-2	0.000	1-1	0.500	1-3	0.250	L1
^ Minnesota Valkyrie	1	3	0	0.250	82	125	-43	11	0-2	0.000	1-1	0.500	1-3	0.250	L3
^ Green Bay Chill	1	3	0	0.250	69	134	-65	10	0-2	0.000	1-1	0.500	1-3	0.250	L1

* - clinched playoff berth ^ - eliminated from playoffs

== Awards ==
League MVP

- Kyle Dehaven - Baltimore Charm
- Nikki Johnson - Las Vegas Sin
- Amber Reed - Los Angeles Temptation
- Marirose Roach - Philadelphia Passion
- Kam Warner - Seattle Mist

Offensive Player of the Year

- Kyle Dehaven - Baltimore Charm
- Nikki Johnson - Las Vegas Sin
- KK Matheny - Tampa Breeze
- Amber Reed - Los Angeles Temptation
- Marirose Roach - Philadelphia Passion

Defensive Player of the Year

- Jenny Butler - Philadelphia Passion
- Kyle Dehaven - Baltimore Charm
- Liz Gorman - Tampa Breeze
- Sunshine Uli - Las Vegas Sin
- Kam Warner - Seattle Mist

Rookie of the Year

- Annie Erler - Green Bay Chill
- Kyle Dehaven - Baltimore Charm
- Chrisdell Harris - Chicago Bliss
- Nikki Johnson - Las Vegas Sin
- Theresa Petruziello - Cleveland Crush

Coach of the Year

- Chandler Brown - Philadelphia Passion
- Dion Lee - Las Vegas Sin
- Chris Michaelson - Seattle Mist
- Tony Nguyen - Minnesota Valkyrie
- Rick Reeder - Baltimore Charm

Mortaza Award

- Kelly Campbell - Baltimore Charm
- Ogom Chijundu - Los Angeles Temptation
- Jessica Hopkins - Seattle Mist
- Donna Paul - Toronto Triumph
- Marirose Roach - Philadelphia Passion

Most Improved Player

- Kelly Campbell - Baltimore Charm
- Ogom Chijundu - Los Angeles Temptation
- Jessica Hopkins - Seattle Mist
- Adrian Purnell - Tampa Breeze
- Amber Reed - Los Angeles Temptation

Team of the Year

- Baltimore Charm
- Green Bay Chill
- Las Vegas Sin
- Philadelphia Passion
- Seattle Mist

Lingerie Bowl MVP

- Ashley Salerno and Amber Reed - Los Angeles Temptation

8th Man Award (Best Fan Base)

- Seattle Mist

LFL Awards Winners
