= Angela Rypien =

Lingerie football player (born 1990)

Profile
- Position: Quarterback

Personal information
- Born: October 22, 1990 (age 36); Reston, Virginia, U.S.
- Listed height: 6 ft 0 in (1.83 m)
- Listed weight: 149 lb (68 kg)

Career history
- Seattle Mist (2011); Baltimore Charm (2012–2013); Calgary Fillies (2013)*
- * Offseason or practice squad member only

Angela Sue Rypien (born October 22, 1990) is a stylist and former American football quarterback. She played for the Seattle Mist and the Baltimore Charm of the Legends Football League (LFL). Rypien is one of the daughters of quarterback Mark Rypien, the only Canadian chosen as Super Bowl MVP when his team, the Washington Redskins, won Super Bowl XXVI. Former Boise State quarterback Brett Rypien is Angela's cousin.

== Professional career ==
Rypien was the quarterback of the Seattle Mist in 2011, and for the Baltimore Charm in 2012.

In July 2013, Matt Vensel, writing in The Baltimore Sun, called Rypien the most prominent player in the league. Most players in the league play for fun, or for the local fame, and the possibility of local endorsement and appearance fees, and need to hold down a day-job. Rypien, on the other hand, is able to support herself solely from working as a model or spokesperson for firms such as Under Armour, EyeBlack and TheraPearl. Prior to playing football, was a stylist. She has been hired by two different teams in the Lingerie Football League.

=== Seattle Mist ===
She served as a quarterback for the Seattle Mist in 2011. She signed to play for the Baltimore Charm in 2012. But the league management decided to cancel the 2012 season in the US, and concentrate instead on exhibition matches in the US, and promotion of foreign leagues.

NBC News reported they were surprised that the Legends Football League allowed free agency, but added "But if you're the daughter of former Redskins quarterback Mark Rypien, and a pretty intense player in your own right, I guess you do."

According to technology journalist Patrick Seitz, the league lacked stars in its early seasons, so the limited press coverage the league received treated it solely as a "peep show". He asserted that Rypien and Krista Ford, due to the reflected notability of having famous relatives, were two potential stars the league could offer in its 2011 season—to counter the peep-show coverage.

== Personal life ==
In 2014, Rypien was reported to be dating professional baseball player Taijuan Walker of the Seattle Mariners.
