= 2010–11 LFL season =

- Duration: August 27, 2010 – January 21, 2011
- Eastern Champions champions: Philadelphia Passion
- Western Champions champions: Los Angeles Temptation

Lingerie Bowl VIII
- Date: February 6, 2011
- Venue: Thomas & Mack Center, Las Vegas
- Champions: Los Angeles Temptation

Seasons
- ← 2009–10 2011–12 →

The 2010–11 LFL Season was the second season of the Lingerie Football League. The league featured 10 teams in various cities across the United States. For the 2010–11 season, the league launched two expansion franchises in the Orlando Fantasy and Baltimore Charm, while the Denver Dream and New York Majesty suspended operations because of issues with home venues.

After the 2009–10 season, in which all games were broadcast exclusively on the internet, the league returned to traditional television for 2010. All games, except for the Lingerie Bowl, were broadcast in edited form on MTV2. The Lingerie Bowl aired on pay-per-view alongside the Super Bowl.

The 2010 LFL All-Fantasy Game was held June 10, 2010, in Monterrey, Mexico, with the Eastern Conference prevailing over the Western Conference 36–14. The All-Fantasy Game's co-MVPs were the Philadelphia Passion's Tyrah Lusby and the Miami Caliente's Anonka Dixon.

The season kicked off on August 27, 2010, and culminated with Lingerie Bowl VIII on February 6, 2011. The LFL Eastern and Western Conference playoff games were played back-to-back on January 29, 2011, at Veterans Memorial Arena in Jacksonville, Florida. The 2011 Lingerie Bowl, played during halftime of Super Bowl XLV, was held at the Thomas & Mack Center in Las Vegas between the Eastern Conference champion Philadelphia Passion and the Western Conference champion Los Angeles Temptation. Los Angeles Temptation won back-to-back titles by defeating the Philadelphia Passion 26–25.

== Teams ==
2010–11 teams
Eastern Conference	Location	Venue
Baltimore Charm	Baltimore, Maryland	1st Mariner Arena
Philadelphia Passion	Trenton, New Jersey	Sun National Bank Center
Miami Caliente	Miami, Florida	FIU Stadium
Orlando Fantasy	Orlando, Florida	UCF Arena
Tampa Breeze	Tampa, Florida	St. Pete Times Forum
Western Conference	Location	Venue
Chicago Bliss	Hoffman Estates, Illinois	Sears Centre
Dallas Desire	Dallas, Texas	Cotton Bowl
Los Angeles Temptation	Los Angeles, California	Los Angeles Memorial Coliseum
San Diego Seduction	San Diego, California	San Diego Sports Arena
Seattle Mist	Kent, Washington	ShoWare Center

== Schedule ==
Date	Visitor	Score	Home	Venue
August 27, 2010	Los Angeles Temptation	36–32	Seattle Mist	ShoWare Center
September 3, 2010	San Diego Seduction	24–13	Dallas Desire	Cotton Bowl
September 10, 2010	Dallas Desire	7–14	Chicago Bliss	Sears Center
September 17, 2010	Baltimore Charm	6–60	Philadelphia Passion	Sun National Bank Center
September 24, 2010	Tampa Breeze	47–6	Orlando Fantasy	UCF Arena
October 1, 2010	Tampa Breeze	33–0	Baltimore Charm	1st Mariner Arena
October 8, 2010	Chicago Bliss	41–12	Seattle Mist	ShoWare Center
October 15, 2010	Philadelphia Passion	27–26	Miami Caliente	FIU Stadium
October 22, 2010	Seattle Mist	25–26	San Diego Seduction	San Diego Sports Arena
October 29, 2010	Miami Caliente	27–19	Orlando Fantasy	UCF Arena
November 5, 2010	Orlando Fantasy	19–42	Baltimore Charm	1st Mariner Arena
November 13, 2010	San Diego Seduction	12–50	Chicago Bliss	Sears Center
November 19, 2010	Baltimore Charm	12–42	Miami Caliente	FIU Stadium
November 26, 2010	Bye week			
December 3, 2010	Dallas Desire	6–40	Los Angeles Temptation	Los Angeles Coliseum
December 10, 2010	Orlando Fantasy	26–35	Philadelphia Passion	Sun National Bank Center
December 17, 2010	Miami Caliente	25–34	Tampa Breeze	St. Pete Times Forum
December 24, 2010	Bye week			
January 1, 2011	Los Angeles Temptation	18–6	San Diego Seduction	San Diego Sports Arena
January 7, 2011	Chicago Bliss	12–18 (OT)	Los Angeles Temptation	Los Angeles Coliseum
January 13, 2011	Philadelphia Passion	31–12	Tampa Breeze	St. Pete Times Forum
January 21, 2011	Seattle Mist	Cancelled (Note: Game was cancelled due to the potential of inclement weather in the outdoor stadium and neither team winning a game in the season.)	Dallas Desire	Cotton Bowl

== Standings ==
=== Eastern Conference ===
Team	Wins	Loss	Ties	Pct	PF	PA	Net Pts	TD's	Home	Road
Philadelphia Passion*	4	0	0	1.000	153	70	83	20	2–0	2–0
Tampa Breeze*	3	1	0	0.750	126	62	64	19	1–1	2–0
Miami Caliente	2	2	0	0.500	120	92	28	18	1–1	1–1
Baltimore Charm	1	3	0	0.250	60	154	-94	9	1–1	0–2
Orlando Fantasy	0	4	0	0.000	70	151	-81	11	0–2	0–2

=== Western Conference ===
Team	Wins	Loss	Ties	Pct	PF	PA	Net Pts	TD's	Home	Road
Los Angeles Temptation*	4	0	0	1.000	112	56	56	17	2–0	2–0
Chicago Bliss*	3	1	0	0.750	117	49	68	17	2–0	1–1
San Diego Seduction	2	2	0	0.500	68	106	-38	11	1–1	1–1
Dallas Desire	0	3	0	0.000	26	78	-52	4	0–1	0–2
Seattle Mist	0	3	0	0.000	69	103	-34	11	0–2	0–1

* - clinched playoff berth

== Playoffs ==
Date	Visitor	Score	Home	Venue
Western Conference championship
January 29, 2011	Chicago Bliss (2)	14–31	Los Angeles Temptation (1)	Veterans Memorial Arena
Eastern Conference Championship
January 29, 2011	Tampa Breeze (2)	14–20	Philadelphia Passion (1)	Veterans Memorial Arena
Lingerie Bowl VIII
February 6, 2011	Los Angeles Temptation	26–25	Philadelphia Passion	Thomas & Mack Center

== Awards ==
LFL Awards Announcement
League MVP

- Ashley Salerno - Los Angeles Temptation
- Heather Furr - Chicago Bliss
- Marirose Roach - Philadelphia Passion
- Deborah Poles - Chicago Bliss

Offensive Player of the Year

- Marirose Roach - Philadelphia Passion
- Ashley Salerno - Los Angeles Temptation
- Heather Furr - Chicago Bliss
- Anonka Dixon - Miami Caliente

Defensive Player of the Year

- Deborah Poles - Chicago Biss
- Danika Brace - Seattle Mist
- Danielle Hawkins - Dallas Desire
- Liz Gorman - Tampa Breeze

Rookie of the Year

- Ashley Salerno - Los Angeles Temptation
- Marirose Roach - Philadelphia Passion
- Heather Furr - Chicago Bliss
- Christie Bell - Philadelphia Passion

Coach of the Year

- Chandler Brown - Philadelphia Passion
- Yo Murphy - Tampa Breeze
- Chris Michaelson - Seattle Mist
- David Bizub - Los Angeles Temptation

Mortaza Award

- Natalie Jahnke - Los Angeles Temptation
- Monique Gaxiola - Los Angeles Temptation
- Shelly Lashley - Philadelphia Passion
- Carie Small - Tampa Breeze
- Lauren Le Bella - Philadelphia Passion

Team of the Year

- Chicago Bliss
- Tampa Breeze
- Los Angeles Temptation
- Philadelphia Passion

Lingerie Bowl MVP

- Ashley Salerno - Los Angeles Temptation
