= Orlando Fantasy =

Former Lingerie Football League team

Logo

General information
- Founded: 2010
- Folded: 2012
- Stadium: UCF Arena (2010–11); Florida Citrus Bowl (2011–12)
- Headquartered: Orlando, Florida
- Colors: White, light blue, silver
- Website: www.lflus.com/orlandofantasy/

Personnel
- Owners: Lingerie Football League, LLC
- Head coach: Doug Miller

League / conference affiliations
- Legends Football League; Eastern Conference

The Orlando Fantasy were a women's American football in the Lingerie Football League that began playing in the 2010–11 season and based in Orlando, Florida.

Initially, former Orlando Predators' quarterback Ben Bennett was named head coach, but resigned due to disagreements with league management. He was replaced by the Predators' defensive specialist Kenny McEntyre. McEntyre was also replaced before the season started by Predators' assistant coach Doug Miller. The team played their two home games at UCF Arena.

In 2011, the team changed home venues and moved outdoors to the Florida Citrus Bowl. Following the team's final game of the 2011–12 season, head coach Miller was fired for behavioral infractions and playing running back Etta Paul after she had sustained a concussion. The team was suspended in May 2012 and never returned.

== 2010–11 roster ==
Orlando Fantasy roster
Quarterbacks: 3 Veronica Moor; Running backs: 5 Quiana Welch; Receivers: 7 Krystle Apellaniz; 10 Monica Zapata; 14 Lauran Ziegler; 15 Jennifer Kraus; Tight ends: 16 Sade Kusimo; 17 Jillian Thacker; 20 Casique Smith; 18 Danielle Ryan.	Defensive linemen: 8 Forrest Stewart; 12 Jeannette McCoy; 13 Jamie Magnor; Linebackers: 9 Tiffani Hardin; Defensive backs: 1 Kristen Strout S; 2 Lindsay Alfano CB; 4 Jennifer Chu CB; 9 Deidra Strickland S; Coaches: Doug Miller, head coach; Andre Cooper, asst. coach; Roster updated 2011-03-04

== Seasons ==
=== 2010–11 schedule ===
Date	Opponent	Score	Location	Television	Record
September 24	Tampa Breeze	Lost, 6–47	UCF Arena	MyNetworkTV	0–1
October 29	Miami Caliente	Lost, 19–27	UCF Arena	MyNetworkTV	0–2
November 5	at Baltimore Charm	Lost, 19–42	1st Mariner Arena	MyNetworkTV	0–3
December 10	at Philadelphia Passion	Lost, 26–35	Sun National Bank Center	MyNetworkTV	0–4

=== 2011–12 schedule ===
Date	Opponent	Score	Location	Record
September 16	at Baltimore Charm	Won, 36–12	1st Mariner Arena	1–0
December 2	Cleveland Crush	Won, 68–8	Florida Citrus Bowl	2–0
December 30	at Tampa Breeze	Lost, 18–20	St. Pete Times Forum	2–1
January 13	Toronto Triumph	Won, 49–18	Florida Citrus Bowl	3–1
