= Rypien =

Rypien is a surname derived from Polish Rypień. Notable people with the surname include:

- Angela Rypien (born 1990), American football player
- Brett Rypien (born 1996), American football player
- Mark Rypien (born 1962), American football player
- Rick Rypien (1984–2011), Canadian hockey player
