= Ladies Gridiron League =

Women's American football league

- Sport: American football
- Founded: 2012
- First season: 2014
- CEO: Brett Chambers (as of 2014)
- Director: Christian Ganaban
- No. of teams: 6
- Countries: Australia
- Most titles: West Coast Angels
- Broadcaster: Aurora
- Website: http://www.ladiesgridiron.com/

The Ladies Gridiron League (LGL) is an Australian-based non-for-profit company running a full contact, 7-a-side, women's American football league. It was created in March 2012 with an overall aim of developing American football upon Australian shores. It is an exclusively run, invite only competition with a focus on professionalism, athleticism and fun. The league aim is “to create a fun and competitive environment that supports the development of females in sport and raises the awareness of Gridiron in Australia. The LGL aims to establish a female Gridiron community that has the ability to mentor people in need, promote fairness, teamwork and respect.”

== Background ==
In its initial stages the LGL was formed with the plan of becoming a feeder league to the previous Legends Football League (LFL) upon its commencement in Australia that year. Before the start of the 2013/14 LFL season, the agreement formed between the leagues was not honoured by the LFL which in turn led the LGL to cut all ties and form as an entirely new league of its own.

In 2014, the Ladies Gridiron League (LGL) officially began with the intention of bringing American Football to the forefront of Women's Sport in Australia. At the request of the players a new uniform was adopted (from the previous LFL 'uniform'), which saw the women in bike pants and sports crop tops as opposed to skimpy lingerie, allowing larger focus on the players sporting talent over a scantily clad attire. Player terms and conditions were also updated ensuring all women became insured during their time with the league and compensated for any related costs.

== Current Teams ==
Current Ladies Gridiron League teams

Team	Stadium	City	Joined
Ladies Gridiron League
Adelaide Phoenix	City Mazda Stadium	Adelaide	2015–16
Brisbane Blaze	Queensland Sport and Athletics Centre	Brisbane	2015–16
Canberra Mustangs	Viking Park	Canberra	2015–16
Melbourne Maidens	To be confirmed	Melbourne	2016–17
Sydney Sirens	Leichhardt Oval	Sydney	2016–17
West Coast Angels	nib Stadium	Perth	2015–16

The Ladies Gridiron League was put into hibernation by Director Christian Ganaban whilst a suitable buyer for the broadcast games and league was pursued. Viva Sports as the LGL's largest creditor assumed control of the LGL in 2017 keeping Christian Ganaban in charge of future operations. Christian is currently working with Vince McMahon's XFL 2020 with a view to relaunch a new incarnation of the league.

== LGL Grand Final Results ==
Game	Winner	Score	Loser	Venue	City	Date	Ref
LGL Grand Final I	West Coast Angels	36-28	Adelaide Phoenix	City Mazda Stadium	Richmond, South Australia	Saturday, 27 February 2016	

== Tri Nations series ==
The Ladies Gridiron League have played and aired a teaser Tri Nations series similar to the Rugby League Tri-Nations and Tri Nations (rugby union) with teams Team Australia, Team New Zealand and Team USA. The LGL was the first women's tackle football league to run an international tri nations competition in Australia. The games were held in Melbourne with New Zealand winning the overall competition, USA second and Australia third.

The Tri Nations series and 2013–14 LGL season of Ladies Gridiron League aired on Aurora Community Channel and Web series called Gridiron Girl is available on Vimeo.

== LGL Tri Nations series Grand Final Results ==
Game	Winner	Score	Loser	Venue	City	Date	Ref
LGL Tri Nations series Grand Final I	New Zealand	24–14	United States	State Netball and Hockey Centre	Parkville, Victoria	Friday 5 Dec 2014	
