= Las Vegas Sin =

Folded lingerie football team

Logo

General information
- Founded: 2011
- Folded: 2015
- Stadium: Orleans Arena (2011–2013); Thomas & Mack Center (2014); Citizens Business Bank Arena (2015)
- Headquartered: Las Vegas, Nevada; Ontario, California
- Colors: Red and white

Personnel
- Owners: Legends Football League, LLC

League / conference affiliations
- Legends Football League; Western Conference

The Las Vegas Sin was a team in the Legends Football League, primarily based in Las Vegas, Nevada. The Sin was originally announced in 2006 as one of four expansion teams to be included in the 2008 Lingerie Bowl along with the Atlanta Steam, Miami Caliente and San Francisco Seduction. The 2008 event was cancelled and the organization then launched the Lingerie Football League (LFL) in 2009. When the league began play in the 2009–10 season, the Sin were not included as one of the ten inaugural franchises.

The 2010–11 LFL season's championship, still called the Lingerie Bowl, was held at the Thomas & Mack Center in Las Vegas, with the announced intention of establishing the Sin for 2011. The confirmation of the Sin came in December 2010. They played their first season at Orleans Arena.

The LFL rebranded to the Legends Football League after the team's first season and shifted to a spring and summer schedule in 2013. In 2014, the Sin moved their home games to the Thomas & Mack Center.

On January 27, 2015, the league announced that the Sin would be playing at Citizens Business Bank Arena in Ontario, California, for the 2015 season due to the Thomas & Mack Center undergoing renovations during the season. They had planned to return for 2016 season, but were suspended indefinitely due to an inability to find a suitable host venue.
