= X League (women's football) =

American women's tackle football league

Extreme Football League
- Most recent season or competition: 2022 X League season
- Formerly: Lingerie Football League (2009–2012); Legends Football League (2013–2019)
- Sport: Women's American football
- Founded: 2009; 17 years ago
- First season: 2009
- Owner: Mike Ditka
- CEO: Mitch Mortaza
- No. of teams: 8
- Countries: United States
- Headquarters: Los Angeles, California
- Most recent champion: Chicago Blitz (2022; 1st title)
- Most titles: Chicago Bliss (4 titles)
- Website: xleague.live

The Extreme Football League (X League) is a women's semi-professional indoor American football league operating in the United States. The league was originally founded in 2009 as the Lingerie Football League (LFL), and it was later rebranded as the Legends Football League in 2013.

They did not play in 2020 or 2021 amid the COVID-19 pandemic. It returned in 2022, concluding with the restructured league's inaugural championship, the X Cup, won by the Chicago Blitz. The league identified its owners as Mike Ditka and Samantha Gordon in 2022. Gordon signed with the Women's Football Alliance in 2025.

The league was inactive from 2023 to 2025, and an announced 2026 season was never played prior to Ditka's death.

== History ==
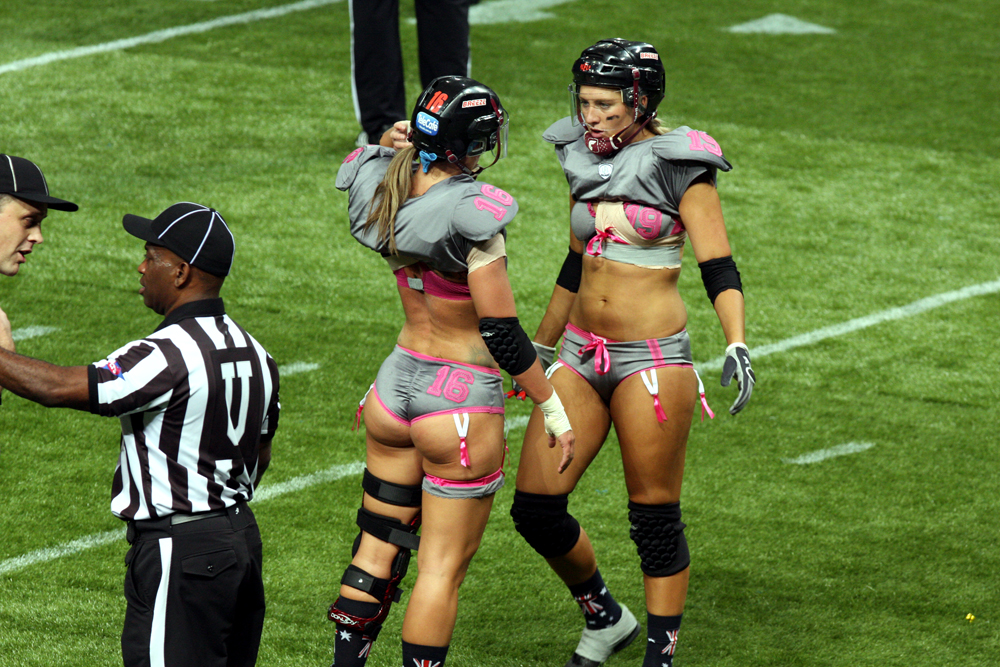
Referees and players during the All-Fantasy Game, Sydney, 2012

=== LFL ===
==== 2009–2012 ====
The concept of the league originated from an alternative Super Bowl halftime television special called the Lingerie Bowl, a pay-per-view event broadcast opposite the Super Bowl halftime show.

In 2009, league chairman Mitch Mortaza expanded the concept from a single annual exhibition game to a ten-team league, branded as the Lingerie Football League, or LFL. The league operated on a similar schedule to the National Football League (NFL), playing in fall and winter and played most of its games indoors with similar rules to indoor football. Many of the teams were coached by former NFL players and coaches who were already well known in their respective cities. Many of the LFL players had a background in other competitive athletics at the college and semiprofessional level, as well as some experience in tackle football from playing in other semiprofessional leagues.

The initial uniforms consisted of shoulder pads, elbow pads, knee pads, performance wear, and ice hockey-style helmets with clear plastic visors in lieu of face masks. The original uniforms of the Lingerie Football League consisted of an athletic bra and underwear that were more revealing than protective, as well as added lace, ribbons, and garters as decoration. While these uniforms were routinely criticized by media, players' reactions were typically mixed on the use of the uniforms, comparing the similarities in coverage to track and field uniforms or beach volleyball bikinis.

==== Expansion and rebranding: 2012–2019 ====
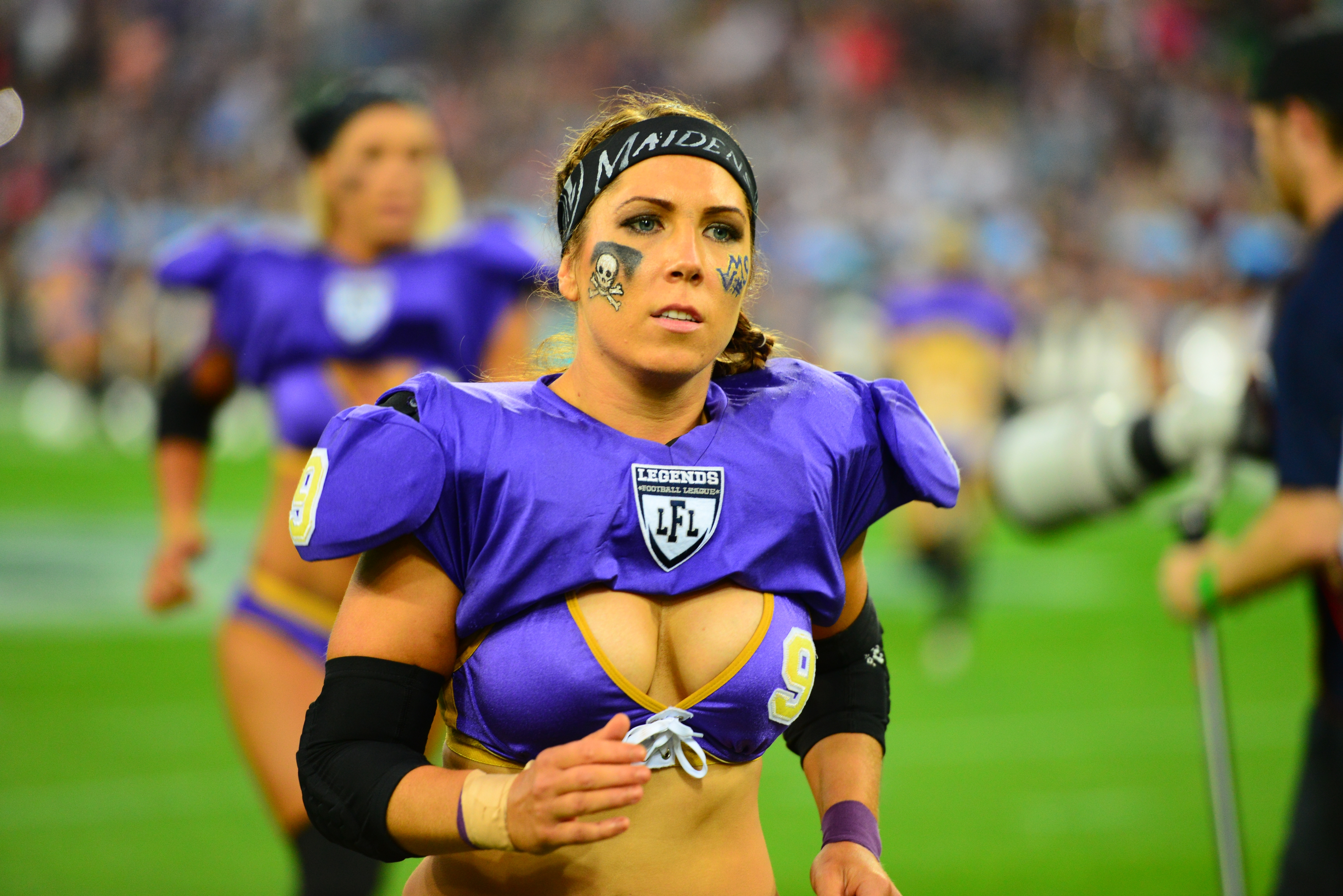
In the LFL, players were allowed to wear make-up or face paint. Picture shows a Victoria Maidens player.

After three seasons, the league announced it was adding a companion league in Canada that began play in August 2012. It then pushed back the US season to 2013 on a spring and summer schedule, mirroring other indoor football leagues.

During the hiatus, the league announced it would change its name to the Legends Football League, retaining the LFL initials, on January 10, 2013. The league also announced that the athletes would wear "performance apparel" instead of lingerie, but the uniforms look very much the same as before. In addition to the new uniforms, redesigned shoulder pads were introduced to provide more protection for players. Other league changes included eliminating images of sexy women from team logos and changing the league tagline from "True Fantasy Football" to "Women of the Gridiron". Along with the rebrand of the league in 2013, the league also began changing the uniforms as the originals were too heavy on sex appeal, initially dropping the ribbons and garters. The league designed new ones for the 2014 season closer to more traditional activewear, resembling uniforms similar to volleyball players, replacing the ribbons with shoelaces on the front of the top and bottom.

The LFL then began looking into a Latin American league with six franchises throughout Mexico, Brazil, and Argentina. On September 16, 2013, the LFL postponed the entire 2013 LFL Canada season until 2014 with plans to merge the US, Canada, and Mexico teams into a single league called LFL North America.

The LFL then formed another league in Australia in December 2013 and played one season. LFL Australia's debut season in the beginning of 2014 marked the debut of the new performance wear uniforms. The LFL planned to launch a fourth global league – LFL Europa – in 2015 with teams in Dublin (Ireland), Manchester (England), Düsseldorf and Hamburg (Germany). Barcelona (Spain) and Frankfurt (Germany) had previously been mentioned as potential franchise cities. With four global leagues, the league announced intentions to compete in a LFL World Bowl in São Paulo in 2015. By July 2014, the league planned a three leagues: LFL Americas, LFL Europa, and LFL Oceania. On June 10, 2015, the LFL announced that there would be no international play through at least 2017 with sole focus on growing the league in the US, the exception being international exhibition games to introduce prospective countries to the league.

The LFL announced new uniforms with new colors for the 2016 season. Numbers and logos were printed on the uniform as opposed to previously being sewn on. In addition, the league also announced that teams would have a choice of camouflage or black alternates. In 2017, the league also added a long pants uniform in lieu of the regular bikini bottom for the final home games.

=== Extreme Football League ===
==== Hiatus and restructuring: 2020–present ====
On December 13, 2019, the league announced that it would not be producing a 2020 season and would re-evaluate markets in the future. Four days later, the LFL was restructured into the Extreme Football League, which was announced to begin play in April 2020. The league size remained at eight teams, which initially were all in the same markets as the former LFL teams, but under new team identities. The Nashville Knights were the only team listed in the X League announcement to not change names, but they were replaced by the Kansas City Force in January 2020. As part of the league restructuring, it began offering ownership stakes to its players and coaches based on the individuals contributions and commitment to the organization, as well as revenue distribution program for merchandise featuring an individual player's likeness. The league also said it was to use 70-yard fields in a press release, although this was never implemented. The league implements a new uniform with full pads.

The league's first season was postponed to a scheduled start in June 2020 due to the COVID-19 pandemic. In May, it had been announced that it was postponed again to April 2021. During the hiatus, the league announced Mike Ditka had been named owner and chairman of the league, with plans on expanding into 24 US markets. The season was ultimately cancelled on May 18, 2021, pushing the league's relaunch to the summer of 2022 due to the pandemic.

The 2022 season began on June 10 with the Chicago Blitz facing the Kansas City Force. After a nine-week regular season with a total of seven games, four teams advanced to the playoffs, with the Blitz capturing the first X Cup title on September 10 when they defeated the Atlanta Empire.

They did not play from 2023 to 2025, but were scheduled to return in 2026, as a hybrid format of tackle and flag football. In the lead-up to the 2026 season the X League website announced several financial sponsorships and merchandising arrangements. A schedule was released which curiously separated the Eastern and Western conference schedules with the latter completing before the former played. As the year began, the website removed the season schedule and no ticket information was available; ticket sites such had no events or ticket prices listed. However, league's social media continued to post about combines and try-outs. When April 4 arrived, the scheduled debut game did not take place and all social media outlets for the league remained silent as to the cause or status of the league prompting confusion among fans and questions about financial fraud and insolvency. Ditka died October 9, 2026.

== Rules ==
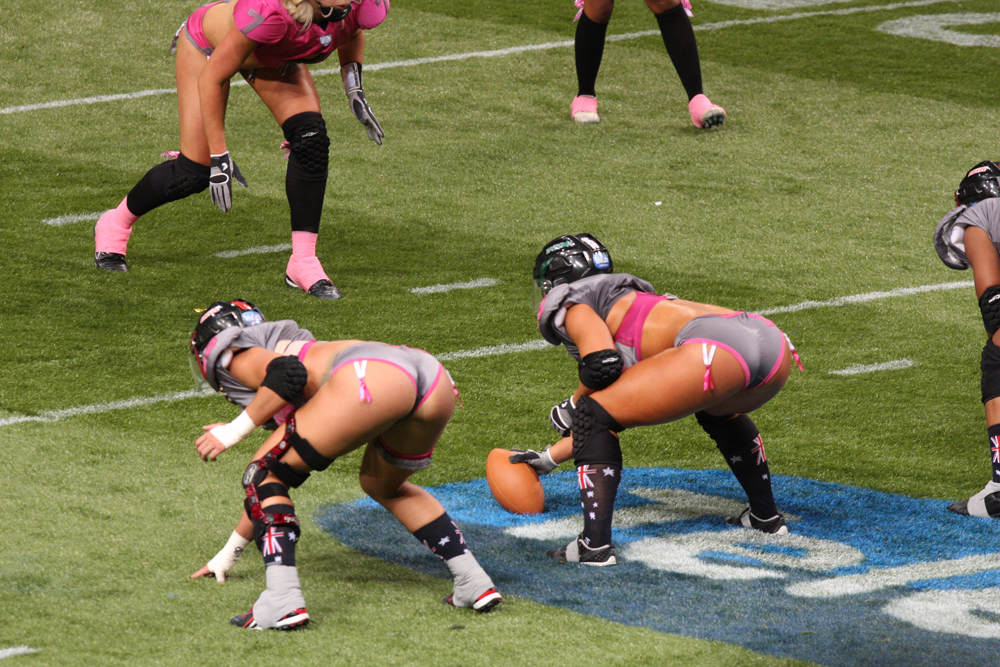
All-Fantasy Game in Sydney, 2012

Playing style is full-contact and similar to other indoor football leagues. There are seven players from each team on the field during play. The field is 50 yards between end zones, 30 yards wide, and the end zones are 8 yards deep, roughly the same as other indoor leagues. Many fields are just over 28 yards wide, as games are often played in converted National Hockey League-sized rinks (85 feet wide), with the plexiglass removed, dasher boards padded, and ice surfaces covered with artificial turf.

There are no kickoffs, except the option for an on-side kick should the game be close near the end, nor field goals; halves and after scores begin on team's own 15-yard line. Kicking off after every scoring drive was added before the 2013 Pacific Cup, but was removed shortly after the first game of the LFL Australia season. A team must attempt to get a first down on every fourth down, or they risk a turnover. After a touchdown, a team can attempt a one-point conversion from the one-yard line, or a two-point conversion from the three-yard line. Since 2015, teams are given the option to punt if within their own 10 yard line; the ball is placed on the 15 or wherever it went out of bounds if the punt is not returned.

A game consists of four ten-minute quarters and a 12-minute halftime (30-minute halftime in championship). In the event of a tie, an extra eight-minute sudden death period is played; whoever scores first wins the game. If still tied, the game ends as a draw, and counts as tie for both teams in the standings. In postseason games, multiple 10-minute sudden death overtime periods are played until one team scores, which wins the game and advances to the next round or wins the championship. Teams get two timeouts per half or overtime period.

== Reception ==
The league was met with criticism throughout its existence. Critics say the league degrades female athletes through "pernicious objectification". The uniforms received extensive criticism for their revealing nature. In an ESPN article, Sarah Spain, the co-host of espnW, wrote, "After watching these women play, I can honestly say I respect the heck out of them as athletes, but I'll still never respect the Lingerie Football League, no matter what name they give it."

LFL players with experience in track and field competitions noted that the typical LFL uniform is comparable to other uniforms, with Elizabeth Govrick of the Minnesota Valkyrie stating she "ran track and I was wearing, you know, stuff if not close to almost smaller than what I'm wearing out on the football field. You take beach volleyball, you take volleyball, you take other sports where it's pretty much the same thing." Adrian Purnell of the Jacksonville Breeze said that the outfits were only for marketing purposes. Heather Furr, a quarterback for the Chicago Bliss said "I think with little girls watching the game ... if they can see past the uniform and see us as role models, then that's what I want." Abbie Sullivan of the Cleveland Crush stated, "Just because we play in the LFL does not mean we promote promiscuity. We are smart females. We are athletes who take care of our bodies. We are the total package." Similarly, Toledo Crush player Marija Condric stated, "Everyone is entitled to their own opinion. Sit down and watch. You'll forget what we are wearing and you will be thinking about how hard that girl got hit on that last play."

Other players are quoted as viewing the uniforms as a necessary evil, with one saying, "Maybe one day, girls won't have to wear lingerie to get people interested [in women's football]." Liz Gorman, a player with the Jacksonville Breeze, stated she would rather wear a conventional uniform: "I mean, I don't like it. You'd rather wear full clothing. I have a bunch of scrapes on me."

The league was accused in its earlier years of fining players for wearing too many clothes, as well as not paying medical bills for injured players. However, the league responded by claiming that fines were given because the equipment worn was in direct conflict with the league's sponsored gear.

The league also prohibited players from commenting on personnel matters, a rule that prompted the vast majority of the Toronto Triumph, including team captain Krista Ford, to quit in protest in October 2011. Originally a professional league with players receiving a cut of net revenue, Mortaza stopped paying his players beginning in the 2011 season and converted the league into an amateur organization; players must also pay for their own health insurance. League founder Mortaza admitted at one point the league was marketed toward "mostly beer-drinking college students aged 21 and up."

=== Safety ===
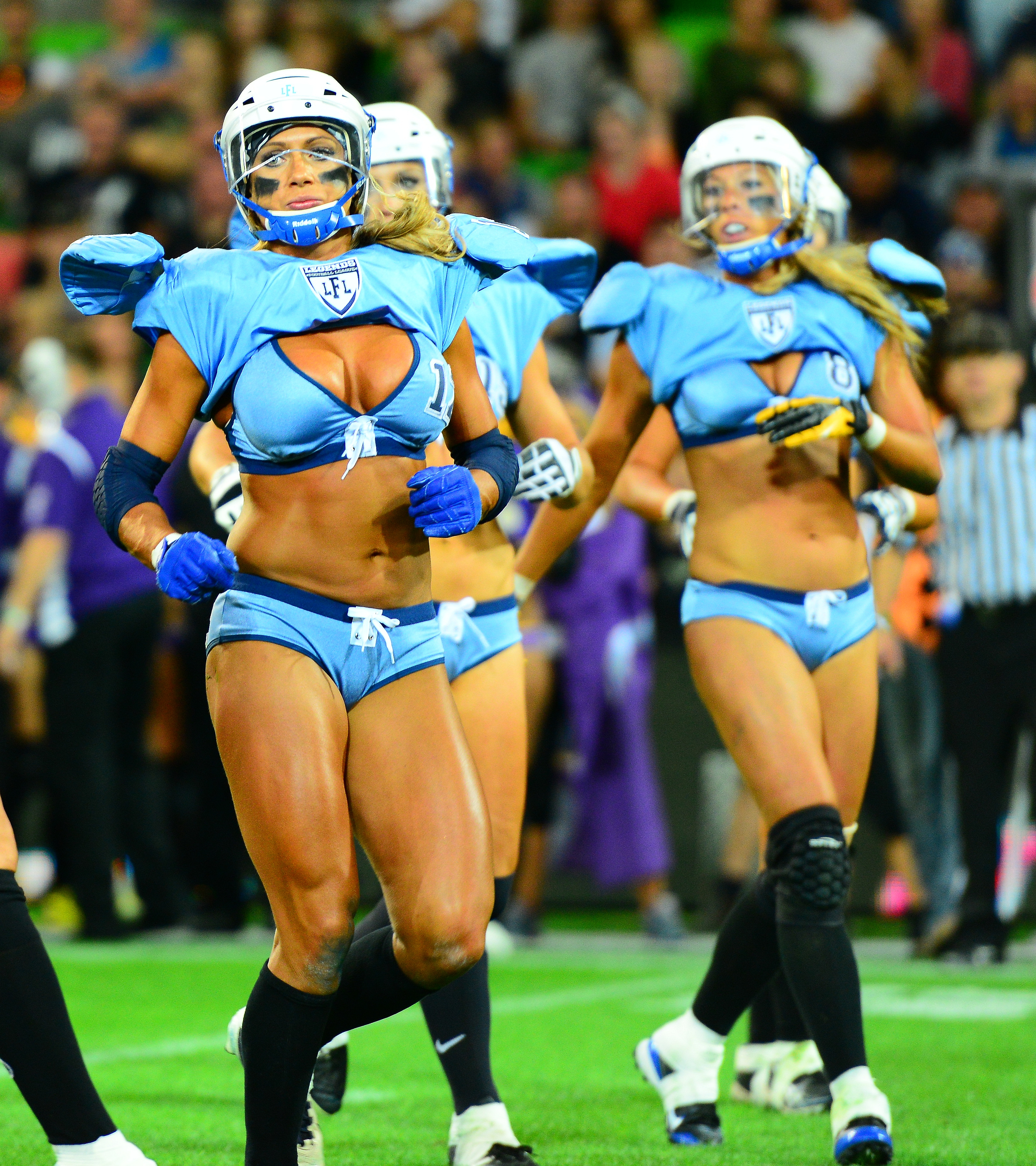
A player of NSW Surge in standard uniform with shoulder pads, knee/elbow pads, and hockey helmet

The league received many complaints from players in regards to safety. Since the uniforms covered very little skin, the players are more susceptible to injury. Ex-lingerie football player Nikki Johnson was one of the many players who experienced injuries in her time in the league including injuries sustained from hard hits and a broken wrist that required surgery.

== Teams ==
=== Current ===
Team	City	Venue	First season
Atlanta Empire	Duluth, Georgia	Gas South Arena	2022
Chicago Blitz	Rockford, Illinois	BMO Harris Bank Center	2022
Dallas Sound	Dallas, Texas	TBA	2022
Denver Rush	Loveland, Colorado	Blue Arena	2022
Los Angeles Black Storm	Irvine, California	Championship Soccer Stadium	2022
Miami Tequestas	Miami, Florida	TBA	2026
New England Defenders	East Hartford, Connecticut	Pratt & Whitney Stadium at Rentschler Field	2026
Seattle Thunder	Kent, Washington	accesso ShoWare Center	2022

=== Former teams ===
==== X League ====
Folded
Team	City	Venue	First season	Last season
Kansas City Force	Independence, Missouri	Cable Dahmer Arena	2022	2022
Never played
Team	City	Venue	Stated to debut	
Arizona Red Devils	Mesa, Arizona	Legacy Park	2022	
Nashville Knights	Nashville, Tennessee	Nashville Auditorium	2020	
Omaha Red Devils	Ralston, Nebraska	Ralston Arena	2020	

==== LFL US ====
Team	City	Venue	First season	Last season
Atlanta Steam	Duluth, Georgia	Infinite Energy Arena	2013	2019
Austin Acoustic	Cedar Park, Texas	H-E-B Center	2016	2019
Baltimore Charm	Baltimore, Maryland	Royal Farms Arena	2010–11	2014
Chicago Bliss	Hoffman Estates, Illinois; Bridgeview, Illinois	Sears Centre Arena; SeatGeek Stadium	2009–10	2019
Cleveland Crush	Cleveland, Ohio	Quicken Loans Arena	2011–12	2013
Dallas Desire	Grand Prairie, Texas; Dallas, Texas	QuikTrip Park; Cotton Bowl	2009–10	2010–11
Dallas Desire	Frisco, Texas	Dr Pepper Arena	2016	
Denver Dream	Commerce City, Colorado	Dick's Sporting Goods Park	2009–10	
Denver Dream	Loveland, Colorado	Budweiser Events Center	2017	2019
Green Bay Chill	Ashwaubenon, Wisconsin; Milwaukee, Wisconsin	Resch Center; U.S. Cellular Arena	2011–12	2014
Jacksonville Breeze	Jacksonville, Florida	Jacksonville Veterans Memorial Arena	2013	2014
Las Vegas Sin	Paradise, Nevada; Ontario, California	Orleans Arena; Thomas & Mack Center; Citizens Business Bank Arena	2011–12	2015
Los Angeles Temptation	Los Angeles, California; Ontario, California	Los Angeles Memorial Coliseum; Los Angeles Memorial Sports Arena; Toyota Arena	2009–10	2019
Miami Caliente	Sunrise, Florida; University Park, Florida	BankAtlantic Center; FIU Stadium	2009–10	2010–11
Minnesota Valkyrie	Minneapolis, Minnesota	Target Center	2011–12	2013
Nashville Knights	Nashville, Tennessee	Nashville Municipal Auditorium	2018	2019
New England Liberty	Manchester, New Hampshire	Verizon Wireless Arena	2016	
New York Euphoria	New York, New York			
New York Majesty	Reading, Pennsylvania	Sovereign Center	2009–10	
Omaha Heart	Ralston, Nebraska	Ralston Arena	2013	2019
Orlando Fantasy	Orlando, Florida	UCF Arena; Florida Citrus Bowl	2010–11	2011–12
Philadelphia Passion	Trenton, New Jersey; Chester, Pennsylvania	Sun National Bank Center; PPL Park	2009–10	2013
Pittsburgh Rebellion	Pittsburgh, Pennsylvania	Highmark Stadium	2017	
San Diego Seduction	San Diego, California	San Diego Sports Arena	2009–10	2010–11
Seattle Mist	Kent, Washington	ShoWare Center	2009–10	2019
Tampa Breeze	Tampa, Florida	Tampa Bay Times Forum	2009–10	2011–12
Toledo Crush	Toledo, Ohio	Huntington Center	2014	
Toronto Triumph	Toronto, Ontario	Ricoh Coliseum	2011–12	
Never played
Team	City	Venue	Stated to debut	
Arizona Scorch	Scottsdale, Arizona			
San Francisco Seduction	Daly City, California	Cow Palace	2009	
St. Louis Saints	St. Charles, Missouri	Family Arena	2013	
Washington Warriorettes	Washington, D.C.	Capital One Arena	2016	

==== LFL Canada ====
Team	City	Venue	Operated
BC Angels	Abbotsford, British Columbia	Abbotsford Entertainment & Sports Centre	2012
Regina Rage	Regina, Saskatchewan	Brandt Centre	2012
Saskatoon Sirens	Saskatoon, Saskatchewan	Credit Union Centre	2012
Toronto Triumph	Mississauga, Ontario	Hershey Centre	2012
Never played
Team	City	Venue	Stated to debut
Calgary Fillies	Calgary, Alberta	Stampede Corral	2013

==== LFL Australia ====
Team	City	Venue	Joined
New South Wales Surge	Penrith, New South Wales	Centrebet Stadium	2013–14
Queensland Brigade	Gold Coast, Queensland	Skilled Park	2013–14
Victoria Maidens	Melbourne, Victoria	AAMI Park	2013–14
Western Australia Angels	Perth, Western Australia	nib Stadium	2013–14
Never played
Team	City	Venue	Stated to debut
Adelaide Arsenal	Adelaide, South Australia	Coopers Stadium	2014–15

== Seasons ==
=== 2009–2010 ===
Ten teams played in the inaugural 2009–2010 LFL season. The league schedule ran from September 4, 2009, to January 29, 2010, with one game each Friday. Teams played one game each against the other four teams in their conference. The top two teams in each conference advanced to the conference championship games held on February 4, 2010, in Miami, and the conference champions played in Lingerie Bowl VII on February 6, 2010. The Western Conference Los Angeles Temptation defeated the Eastern Conference Chicago Bliss by the score of 27–14.

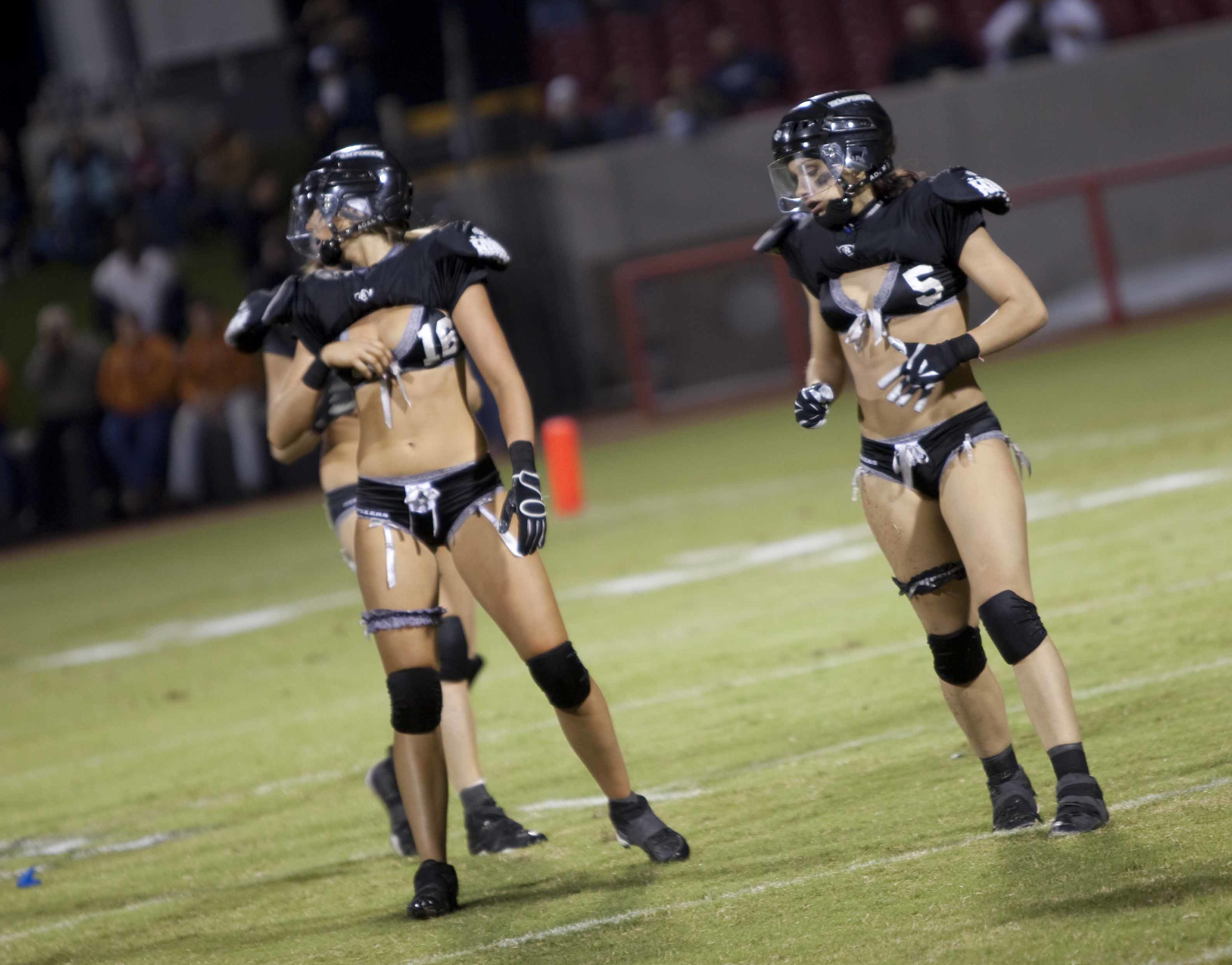
Los Angeles Temptation players, 2009

=== 2010–2011 ===
For the 2010–2011 season, the LFL added new franchises in Orlando and Baltimore, while the New York Majesty and Denver Dream suspended operations. The 2011 Lingerie Bowl was held in Las Vegas, Nevada, on February 6, 2011. The Western Conference champion Los Angeles Temptation defeated Eastern Conference champion Philadelphia Passion, 26–25.

The 2011 All-Fantasy Game was held in Hamilton, Ontario, on July 30, 2011, at Copps Coliseum. Trailing 18–6 in the second half, the Eastern Conference rallied to win, 24–18, over the Western Conference. Anonka Dixon, quarterback for the Orlando Fantasy, was awarded offensive MVP for her 3 touchdown passes and game-winning rushing touchdown, while Liz Gorman, a safety with the Tampa Breeze, was named defensive MVP.

=== 2011–2012 ===
The logo of the Lingerie Football League

The LFL accepted five expansion franchises – the Cleveland Crush, Green Bay Chill, Las Vegas Sin, Minnesota Valkyrie, and Toronto Triumph, while the Dallas Desire, San Diego Seduction, and Miami Caliente suspended operations. The season kicked off on August 26, 2011, and culminated with Lingerie Bowl IX on February 4, 2012. The LFL Eastern and Western Conference championship games were played back-to-back on January 28, 2012, at Citizens Business Bank Arena in Ontario, California. For the second straight year, the Los Angeles Temptation won the Western Conference championship while the Philadelphia Passion won the Eastern Conference championship, setting up a rematch in the 2012 Lingerie Bowl of the previous year's championship game. The 2012 Lingerie Bowl was played at Orleans Arena in Las Vegas, in the afternoon prior to the start of Super Bowl XLVI. The Los Angeles Temptation won its third consecutive Lingerie Bowl with a 28–6 victory over Philadelphia Passion. The Temptation's Ashley Salerno and Amber Reed were co-MVP's, with Salerno throwing three touchdown passes and Reed scoring two rushing touchdowns.

In 2012, the LFL expanded its annual "All-Fantasy" game into a three-game international series, with one game in Mexico and two games in Australia. The Mexico All-Fantasy Game took place on May 5, 2012, at the Palacio de los Deportes in Mexico City; the Western Conference defeated the Eastern Conference, 37–7. The second match of the "2012 LFL All-Fantasy Tour" took place in Brisbane, Australia, on June 2, 2012, at the Brisbane Convention & Exhibition Centre; the Western Conference again emerged victorious, this time by a 45–36 score. The Western Conference took a 3–0 series sweep with a 31–24 victory in the third and final "All-Fantasy" match in Sydney, Australia, on June 9, 2012, at Allphones Arena. Queensland native and wide receiver for the Los Angeles Temptation Chloe Butler served as the ambassador of LFL Football coming to Australia and captained the Western Conference squad. The LFL then helped found the Ladies Gridiron League in Australia to serve as a minor league for the announced LFL Australia expansion.

=== 2012 Canada ===
For the 2011–12 LFL United States season, the All-Fantasy Game was played in Hamilton, Ontario. This was due in part to the league's announcement that in 2012 there would be a Canadian Lingerie Football League. LFL Canada was originally scheduled for a twelve-week season with teams in six markets.

On September 28, 2011, it was announced that, in addition to the Toronto Triumph who began play in LFL United States, LFL Canada's other five markets would consist of Vancouver, Calgary, Edmonton, Quebec City, and Montreal; ironically, none of those five markets would actually get an LFL franchise. On February 9, 2012, the LFL announced that Abbotsford, British Columbia, would be the next Canadian city to host a team in the League. The franchise played its home games at the Abbotsford Entertainment & Sports Centre and competed in the Western Division of LFL Canada. On February 20, 2012, the LFL announced that the franchise would be named the BC Angels following the results of an online fan vote. The decision for Abbotsford to host a team sparked some controversy, including expressed concern from at least one city councilor, as "Abbotsford is a deeply religious agricultural community."

On February 22, 2012, the LFL announced that Regina, Saskatchewan, would be the next Canadian city to host a team in the League. Home games would be played at the Brandt Centre. On March 6, the LFL announced that the franchise would be named the Regina Rage after an online fan vote.

Six days later, on February 28, the LFL announced that Saskatoon, Saskatchewan, would join Regina as LFL Canada's second team in the Wheat Province. Home games would be played at the Credit Union Centre. Upon releasing the Saskatoon Sirens' logo and colors, the league announced that LFL Canada was set at four teams for the 2012 season, with the league playing an eight-game schedule, scheduled to end with Lingerie Bowl I Canada the week before the Grey Cup.

The 2012 LFL Canada season began on August 25, 2012, and culminated with Lingerie Bowl Canada I on November 17, 2012, between the Saskatoon Sirens and the BC Angels at the Abbotsford Entertainment & Sports Centre in Abbotsford, British Columbia. The BC Angels won the inaugural championship game 25–12 with BC Angels' quarterback Mary Anne Hanson and receiver Aleesa Garcia named as the game's MVPs.

On December 15, 2012, the first annual Pacific Cup was played between the Seattle Mist of LFL US and the BC Angels of LFL Canada. Dubbed the 'Border War', the game was hosted by the Seattle Mist at the ShoWare Center in Kent, Washington, with home venues alternating each season.

=== 2013 season ===
Logo as the Legends Football League

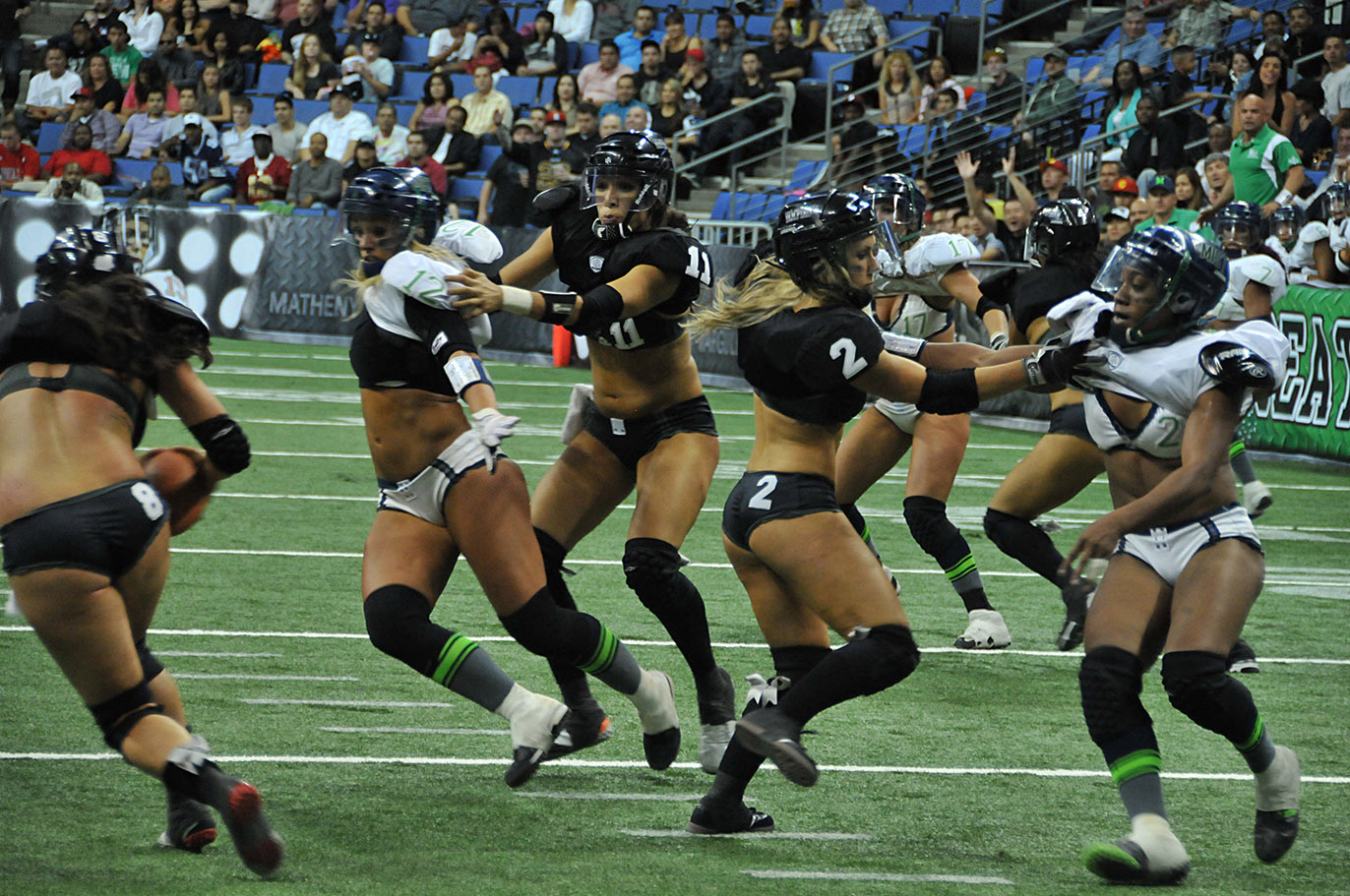
Los Angeles Temptation vs Seattle Mist in Action in Los Angeles – May 4, 2013

The league delayed the next LFL US season from fall/winter 2012 to April 2013 in order to shift to a spring/summer schedule and to focus on the 2012 LFL Canada season.

On June 27, 2013, the 2013 LFL Canada schedule was released. LFL Canada accepted one proposed expansion team, the Calgary Fillies; their home games would be played at the Stampede Corral. Meanwhile, the Toronto Triumph suspended operations for the 2013 season, bringing the number of LFL Canada teams back to four. On September 16, 2013, the LFL then postponed the entire 2013 LFL Canada season until 2014.

However, the BC Angels were expected to participate in the second-annual Pacific Cup, an exhibition game between the Angels and LFL US's Seattle Mist scheduled for December 2013. On October 3, it was announced that the Angels would be replaced in the game by the LA Temptation, citing not enough preparation. The Pacific Cup was played at ShoWare Center on December 6, 2013. Several key players from the Angels joined the Mist while a few key players from Las Vegas Sin joined the Temptation.

=== 2013–14 Australia ===
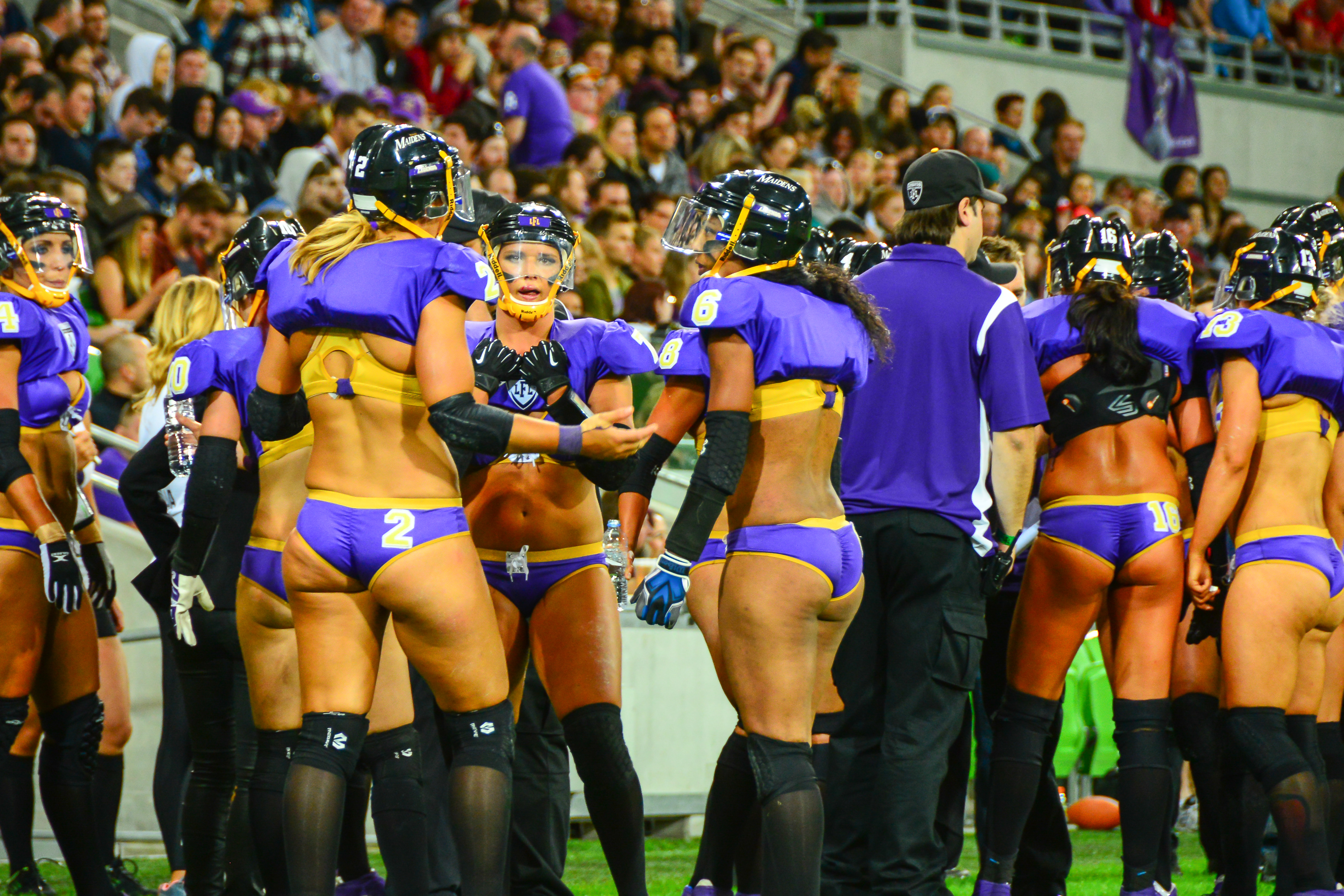
Victoria Maidens players discuss their strategy

Following the two All-Fantasy games held in Australia in 2012, LFL Australia premiered in December 2013. Prior to the playing a game, the LFL's deal with the Ladies Gridiron League (LGL) fell through and the LGL no longer served as a minor league to the LFL. The New South Wales Surge, Queensland Brigade, Victoria Maidens, and Western Australia Angels participated in the inaugural 2013–14 LFL Australia season. The LFL Australia Legends Cup was played on February 8, 2014, at nib Stadium in Perth, Western Australia.

On March 23, 2014, LFL Australia accepted one proposed expansion team, the Adelaide Arsenal, with home games to be played at the Coopers Stadium. However, on September 29, the 2014–2015 season was cancelled due to the lack of a broadcast partner with competition planned to resume in 2015–2016 including an expansion into New Zealand.

In February 2015, it was revealed that the players and coaches had actually left after disputes and issues with LFL management, namely commissioner Mortaza. Players and coaches left and joined the Ladies Gridiron League, originally a subsidiary of the LFL now operating as its own league.

=== 2014 season ===
In the 2013 offseason, the LFL announced that the Philadelphia Passion and Minnesota Valkyrie had suspended operations for the 2014 LFL US season.

It was also announced that the Cleveland Crush were moving to Toledo, Ohio, and play its home games at the Huntington Center.

=== 2016 season ===
On September 16, 2015, Austin, Texas, received an expansion team for 2016 to play at the Cedar Park Center and the name was announced as the Austin Acoustic. On November 2, it was announced that Dallas, Texas, would rejoin the league in 2016 after being on hiatus since the end of the 2010–2011 season, retaining the Dallas Desire name, at Dr Pepper Arena. The Las Vegas Sin then suspended operations. A team was also added for New England bringing the league's total to eight teams.

During the season, New England was forced to forfeit its final game as injuries caused the team to have below the minimum number of players needed to field a team. Seattle won a three-way tie with Dallas and Los Angeles for the best record in the Western Conference while Chicago had the best record in the Eastern Conference. Chicago and Atlanta advanced to the playoffs in the East while Seattle and Dallas advanced in the West. Chicago and Seattle won their Conference Championships and advanced to the Legends Cup in a rematch of both the previous championship and a meeting earlier in the season though with the opposite result of those two prior matches. The season ended on August 27, 2016, with the Chicago Bliss defeating the Seattle Mist 31–26 to win their third Legends Cup. The championship game was played at WestWorld in Scottsdale, Arizona.

=== 2017 season ===
The 2017 season began with new teams at Pittsburgh and Denver replacing New England and Dallas. Three teams (Chicago, Los Angeles, and Seattle) completed the regular season with perfect 4–0 records, a first in LFL history. Chicago and Atlanta advanced to the playoffs from the East while Seattle and Los Angeles advanced in the West. Atlanta upset Chicago in the Eastern Conference Championship, their first victory against the Bliss following seven consecutive defeats. In a war of unbeatens, Seattle bested Los Angeles in the Western Conference Championship. The season ended on September 3, 2017, as the Seattle Mist beat the Atlanta Steam 38–28 in the Legends Cup, played at the Citizens Business Bank Arena in Ontario, California, to cap off their perfect 6–0 season to go with their second LFL title.

=== 2019 season ===
The 2019 season was the tenth and final season of the Legends Football League. It began April 5 and concluded on August 10.

=== 2022 season ===
Following a regular season reduced to two games per team, the Chicago Blitz defeated the Atlanta Empire in the first X Cup championship game, 19–12.

=== 2023-present ===
The 2023, 2024, and 2025 seasons were not played. The League occasionally posted news on their website of financial partnerships and merchandising deals and eventually the X League advertised its next season beginning on April 4, 2026 with a schedule that divided the league into two conferences with the Western Conference playing all of their games before the Eastern Conference would begin play. This unusual format was questionable but no reason was given as to why it was chosen. While the schedule was posted, options for purchasing tickets to these games were not made available. As the date approached the league's website removed the season schedule and its social media ignored the lack of ticket sale options or the aforementioned change to its website. When April 4 arrived, no game was held and the league's social media went silent leaving fans to speculate on the possibility of fraud being perpetrated.

== Media ==
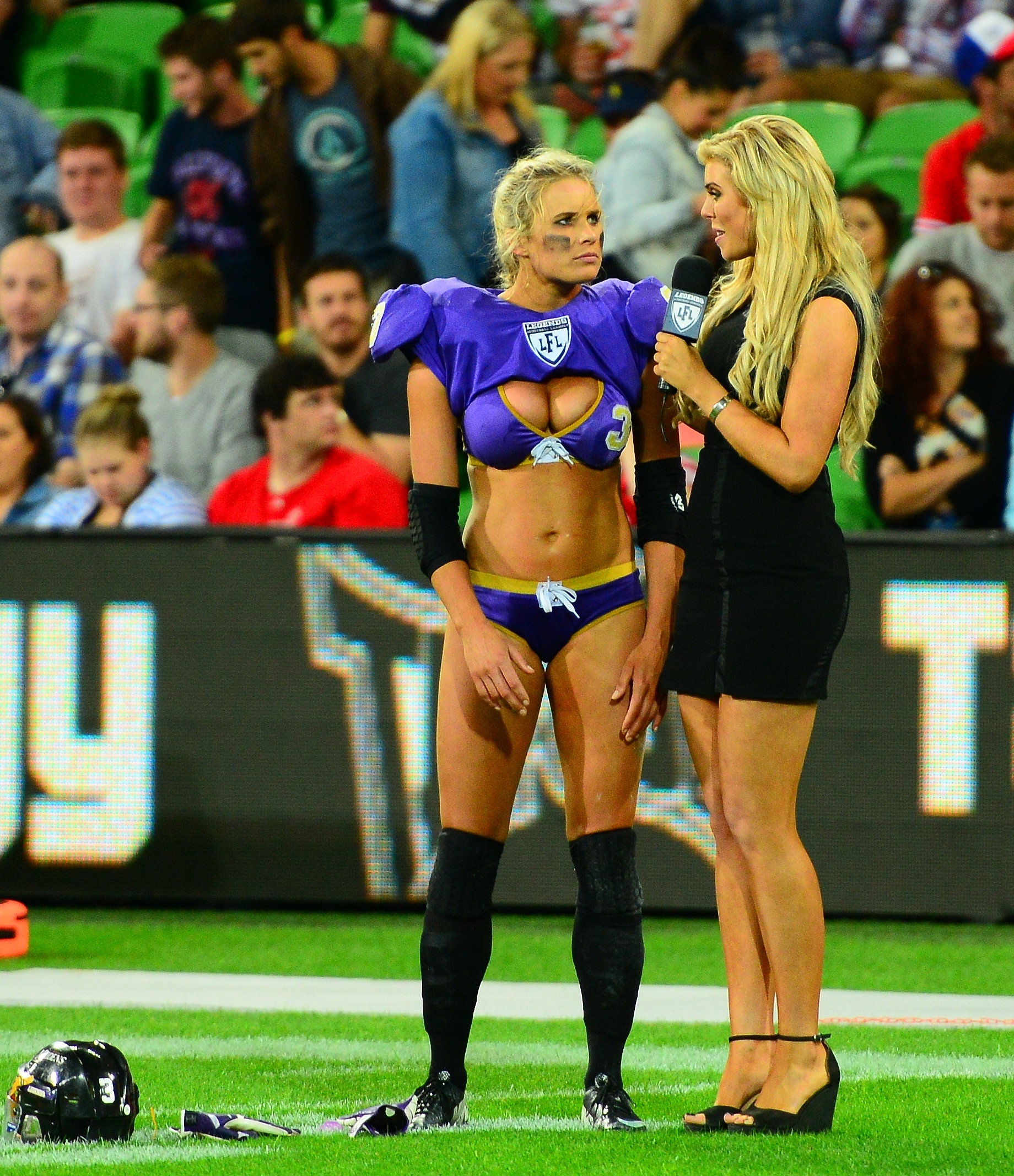
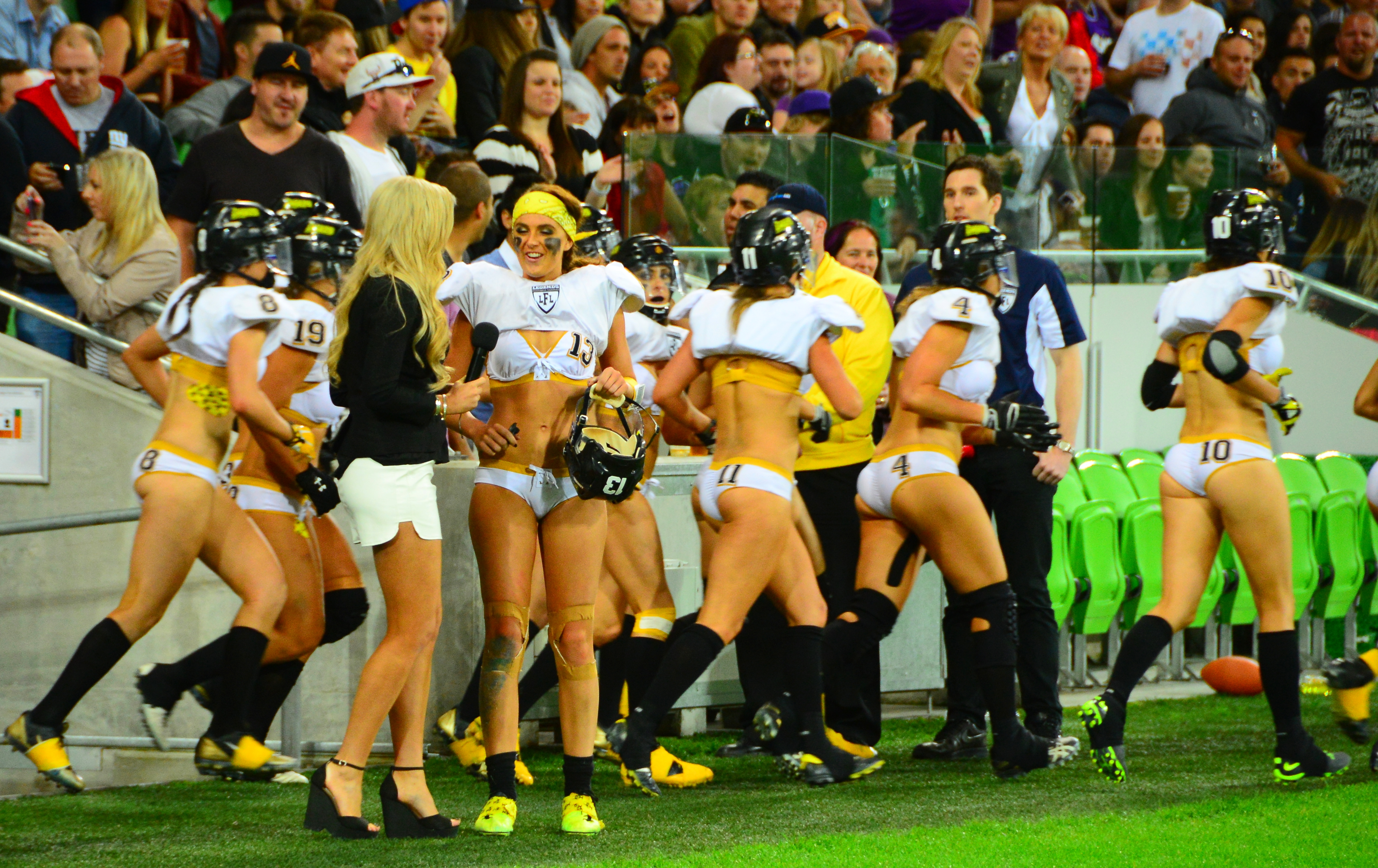
Sports reporters interviewing LFL players

=== Broadcasts ===
In 2010, MTV2 licensed the broadcast rights to 20 regular season and two conference playoff games and aired highlights of those games on a program entitled LFL Presents: LFL, Friday Night Football on MTV2. For the 2011–12 season, MTV2 also broadcast the championship game, in addition to presenting the games in their entirety and broadcasting them live at 9:00 PM ET.

In 2013, the league began airing their games exclusively online on a week-delayed basis, releasing their games every Saturday on YouTube. Games are shot in 1080i.

At the start of the 2013–2014 Australia season, LFL signed an agreement with 7mate in Australia to broadcast games every Saturday night.

In 2015, Fuse became the exclusive broadcaster of LFL games in the United States. Games are broadcast on a week-delay basis on Saturday nights, and are later uploaded to YouTube on Fridays. In the Fall, Oxygen premiered the reality series, Pretty. Strong., which focuses on the lives and careers of the Chicago Bliss. The show was produced by Relativity Television.

For the 2016 season, games were broadcast in select markets on affiliates of The CW and MyNetworkTV as well as Regional sports networks on a week-delayed basis.

In 2017, Super Channel became the exclusive Canadian broadcaster of all LFL games through the 2019 season. Super Channel used the LFL to launch its "Super Channel SPORTS" sub-brand for all sporting and events and sports-themed programming. Meanwhile, Eleven Sports Network acquired the broadcast rights to the LFL in the United States.

In May 2022, the league announced on Twitter that it would be launching a new subscription service called "Fan Pass" to directly stream games live and on-demand.

=== Fantasy football ===
In 2011, the Legends Football League partnered with Fantazzle Fantasy Sports to present a fantasy football game for the LFL. It was relaunched in 2013 as "LFL PartyDeck".

=== Video game ===
In 2012, the Legends Football League teamed with Japanese-based Yuke's Co. Ltd to design and develop an official LFL game.

== See also ==
- American football in the United States
- Bikini Basketball Association – Defunct American women's basketball league
- Foxy boxing – Form of sports entertainment
- List of leagues of American football
  - United States Women's Football League
  - Women's Football Alliance
  - Women's National Football Conference
- Women's American football
- Women's football in the United States
- Women's sports in the United States
