= Huntington Center (Toledo, Ohio) =

Multi-purpose indoor arena in Toledo, Ohio, U.S.

Coordinates: 41°38′59″N 83°32′14″W

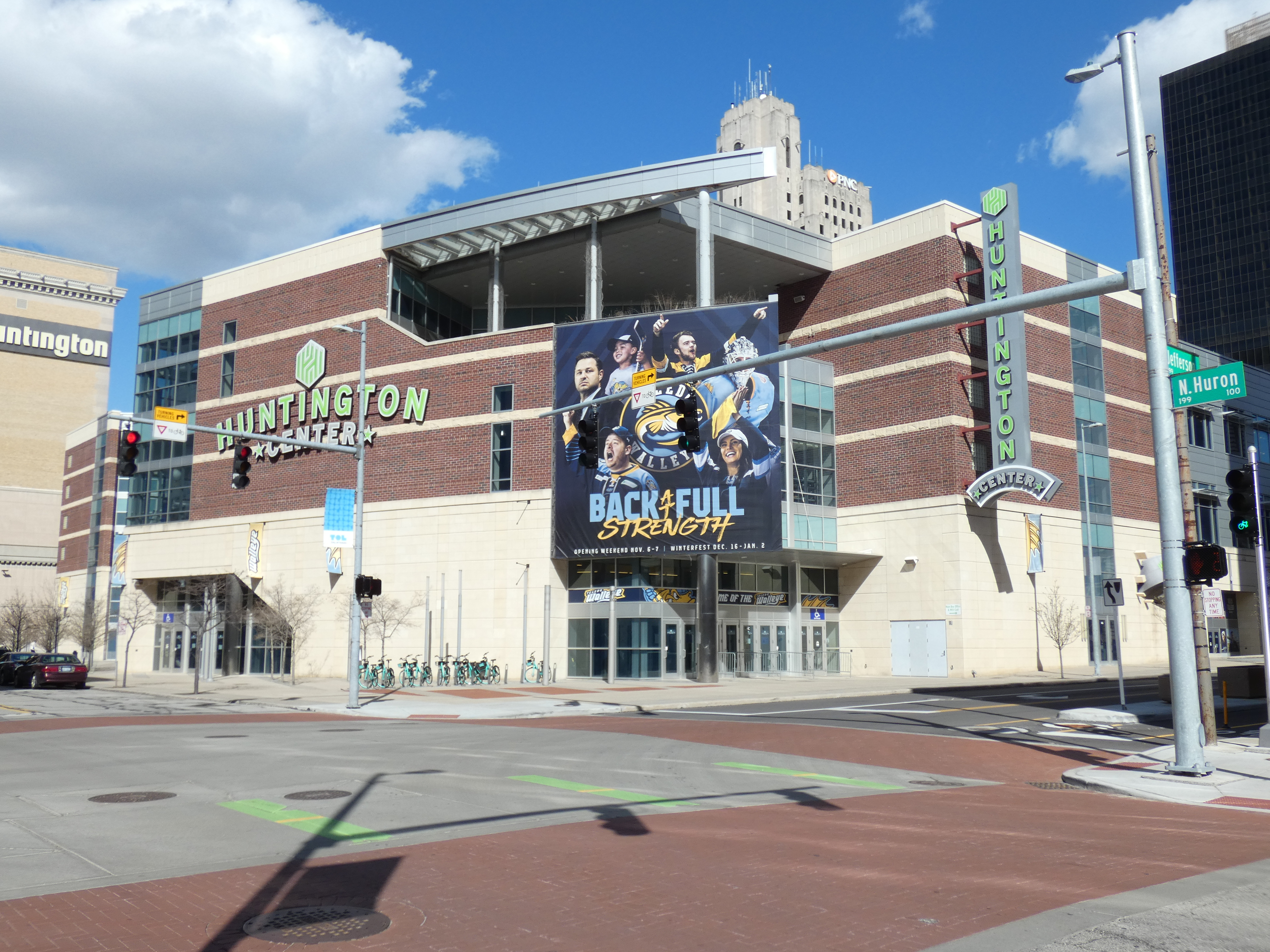
- The arena in 2022

- Location within Ohio Location within the United States
- Former names: Lucas County Arena (2009–2010)
- Address: 500 Jefferson Avenue
- Location: Toledo, Ohio, U.S.
- Owner: Lucas County
- Operator: ASM Global
- Capacity: Concerts: 4,784 (half-house); 5,903 (3/4 house); 7,286 (End-stage); 9,341 (center-stage); Basketball: 8,000; Ice Hockey: 7,389 (8,300 with standing room)
- Surface: Concrete

Construction
- Groundbreaking: October 1, 2007
- Opened: October 3, 2009
- Cost: $105 million ($158 million in 2025 dollars)
- Architects: HNTB; The Collaborative Inc.
- Project manager: Project Management Consultants LLC
- Structural engineer: Poggemeyer Design Group
- Services engineers: M-E Engineers, Inc.
- General contractor: Lathrop/R. Gant LLC

Tenants
- Toledo Walleye (ECHL) (2009–present); Toledo Crush (LFL) (2014)

Website
- huntingtoncentertoledo.com

The Huntington Center is an 8,000-seat multi-purpose arena in downtown Toledo, Ohio. It was completed in 2009 and cost $105 million to build. It replaced the Toledo Sports Arena, which has since been demolished.

It serves as the home of the Toledo Walleye ECHL ice hockey team, and was the home of the Toledo Crush of the Legends Football League for the 2014 season.

== History ==
After a successful partnership on the Mud Hens Stadium (Fifth Third Field), the Lucas County Commissioners teamed with HNTB Architecture Inc., a national sports architecture firm located in Kansas City; The Collaborative Inc., of Toledo; and Poggemeyer Design Group, of Toledo, for a new arena.

The arena was designed as the first new LEED sports arena in the United States. The arena's signature green design element is a 900-square-foot (84 m^{2}) "green wall" outside of the building, to feature the use of plant life on the exterior of the building to help cool the arena by shading the glass-enclosed main entrance of the arena. The arena's location near mass transit systems, use of a light-colored roof membrane to reflect heat and sunlight, and underground cisterns collecting rain water to re-use for landscaping purposes around the arena, are also emphasized to earn LEED points for the project.

The Huntington Center opened in 2009.

== Notable events ==
The Huntington Center was formerly known as the Lucas County Arena

The arena is part of a complex that includes SeaGate Convention Centre and Fifth Third Field. The first person to perform at this venue was Jeff Dunham.

Other performances that have happened at the Huntington Center include: Janet Jackson, Daughtry, Tool, Lil' Wayne, Rascal Flatts, Carrie Underwood, Elton John, Brad Paisley, Stevie Nicks, Kid Rock, Jason Aldean, Hunter Hayes, Bob Seger, Trans-Siberian Orchestra, TobyMac, Snoop Dogg, Wiz Khalifa, Ying Yang Twins, & Disturbed. It's also the Toledo-area stop for WWE. All Elite Wrestling debuted in Toledo with AEW Collision on Saturday, October 14, 2023.

Huntington Bancshares Incorporated bought the naming rights to Lucas County Arena in April 2010 and renamed it as the Huntington Center. The six-year, $2.1 million naming rights and sponsorship agreement includes three renewal options of six years each, and could mean total Huntington payments of $11 million. The proceeds are to be applied to paying down the arena's $90 million debt.

The Huntington Center hosted the 2019 CCM/ECHL All Star Classic on January 21, 2019.
