= Minnesota Valkyrie =

Women's American football team

Logo

General information
- Founded: 2011
- Folded: 2013
- Stadium: Target Center
- Headquartered: Minneapolis, Minnesota
- Colors: Purple, gold, white
- Website: www.lflus.com/minnesotavalkyrie/

Personnel
- Owners: Lingerie Football League, LLC

League / conference affiliations
- Legends Football League; Western Conference

The Minnesota Valkyrie were a women's American football team that played in the Legends Football League (formerly the Lingerie Football League). Based in Minneapolis, Minnesota, the team played their home games at the Target Center.

On March 23, 2011, it was announced that the Lingerie Football League (LFL) would add an expansion team to Minneapolis for the 2011–12 season. On April 4, 2011, the team was officially named Minnesota Valkyrie. Tony Nguyen was the head coach for the first season.

The LFL announced that it would suspend operations of the teams in the United States for the 2012–13 season, but returned in the spring of 2013 rebranded as the Legends Football League. Benson Manento was the head coach in 2013. The team folded in December 2013.

== Seasons ==
=== 2011–12 schedule ===
Game	Date	Opponent	Score	Location	Television	Record
1	August 26	at Green Bay Chill	Won, 28–25	Resch Center	MTV2	1–0
2	October 14	Los Angeles Temptation	Lost, 7–28	Target Center	MTV2	1–1
3	November 19	Chicago Bliss	Lost, 33–40	Target Center	MTV2	1–2
4	January 6	at Seattle Mist	Lost, 14–32	ShoWare Center	MTV2	1–3

=== 2013 schedule ===
Game	Date	Opponent	Score	Location	Record
1	May 11	at Green Bay Chill	Lost, 8–40	Resch Center	0–1
2	July 6	at Seattle Mist	Lost, 0–38	ShoWare Center	0–2
3	July 26	Chicago Bliss	Lost, 12–25	Target Center	0–3
4	August 9	Los Angeles Temptation	Cancelled (Note: The LFL recorded this a Tie/No Contest.)	Target Center	0–3–1
