= Baltimore Charm =

Franchise in the Legends Football League

Logo

General information
- Founded: 2010
- Folded: 2015
- Stadium: 1st Mariner Arena
- Headquartered: Baltimore, Maryland
- Colors: Purple, black, white, gold
- Website: http://www.lflus.com/baltimorecharm/ http://www.baltimorecharmlfl.com

Personnel
- Owners: Lingerie Football League, LLC
- Head coach: Rick Reeder

League / conference affiliations
- Legends Football League

The Baltimore Charm was a team in the Legends Football League with home games at 1st Mariner Arena in Baltimore, Maryland. They began their inaugural 2010–2011 season in the Lingerie Football League on September 17, 2010, and finished with a 1–3 record. Baltimore entered its second season in the LFL's Eastern Conference in September 2011, ending with a 2–2 record. The league rebranded before the 2013 season as the Legends Football League.

On January 27, 2015, the league announced that Charm had suspended operations after four seasons with plans to return in 2016 following a move to the Washington, D.C./Northern Virginia market. The relocated team was to be called the Washington Warriorettes, but continually postponed its inaugural season.

== Roster ==
2011–2012 Baltimore Charm
Quarterbacks: 9 Stacy Moon~; 18 Morgan Spencer; Running backs: 1 Kyle DeHaven****~; 14 Opal Jones; 16 Kacey L. White; 12 Madrienne Shamley; Receivers: 2 Brittany Tegeler; 18 Morgan Spencer; 19 Christina Deavers; 20 Chantelle Ringgold; Offensive linemen: 10 Ashley Helmstetter TE~; 11 Holly Wilson C; 13 Teefa Williams TE; 17 Tiana Michaels TE~; Defensive linemen: 12 Madrienne Shamely DE; 15 Teresa Watson DE; 17 Tiana Michaels DE	Linebackers: 1 Kyle DeHaven ML; 10 Ashley Helmstetter ML; 14 Opal Jones ML; Defensive backs: 2 Brittany Tegeler CB; 3 Kelly K. Campbell CB**~; 5 Erin Stewart CB/S; 8 Charli Jackson S; 14 Opal Jones S; Remaining Roster: 4 Teresa Anders WR; 6 Becca Turner QB; 7 Alexis Brach MLB/C; 16 Arminta Crosby DE; Coaches: Rick Reeder, Head Coach; * Indicates a nomination for the 2011–2012 LFL Awards ~ Indicates 2012 All-Fantasy Team Member Roster updated 2012-01-10

2013 Baltimore Charm
Quarterbacks: 11 Angela Rypien; 18 Morgan Spencer; Running backs: 16 Tiana 'TC' Mesta; Receivers: 2 Allison Dickey; 7 Crystal Keys; 9 Tamara Harris; 18 Morgan Spencer; 20 Jessica Duncan; 10 Leslie Gartner; Jeanine Batcher; Offensive linemen: 8 Heather L. Hudson TE; 7 Crystal Keys TE; Ashley Helmstetter TE/C; 19 Angela Orsini C; Leslie Gartner C	Defensive linemen: 1 Deanna Allik DE; 6 Ida Bernstein DE; 13 Teefa Williams DE; 15 Kim Jack DE/MLB; 16 Tiana 'TC' Mesta DE; 17 Julie Oleson MLB/DE; Defensive backs: 3 Kelly K. Campbell CB*~; 5 Kenice Brown, S; 8 Heather L. Hudson CB; 10 Leslie Gartner S; 12 Tashawna Gaines S; 14 Opal Jones S; Coaches: Gary Clark, Head Coach; John Booty, Asst. Head Coach; Ravin Caldwell, Asst. Head Coach; * Indicates a nomination or win for the 2013 LFL Awards ~ Indicates 2013 All-Fantasy Team Member Roster updated 2012-01-10

== 2010–2011 schedule ==
Week	Date	Opponent	Score	Location	Television	Record
1	September 17	@ Philadelphia Passion	Lost, 6–60	Sun National Bank Center	MTV2	0–1
2	October 1	Tampa Breeze	Lost, 0–33	1st Mariner Arena	MTV2	0–2
3	November 5	Orlando Fantasy	Won, 42–19	1st Mariner Arena	MTV2	1–2
4	November 19	@ Miami Caliente	Lost, 12–42	FIU Stadium	MTV2	1–3

== 2011–2012 schedule ==
Week	Date	Opponent	Score	Location	Television	Record
1	September 16	Orlando Fantasy	Lost	1st Mariner Arena	MTV2	0–1
2	September 23	@ Cleveland Crush	Won, 20–19	Quicken Loans Arena	MTV2	1–1
3	October 28	@ Toronto Triumph	Won	Ricoh Coliseum	MTV2	2–1
4	November 18	Philadelphia Passion	Lost, 12–24	1st Mariner Arena	MTV2	2–2

== 2013 schedule ==
Week	Date	Opponent	Score	Location	Television	Record
1	May 25	@ Jacksonville Breeze	Lost, 12–27	Veterans Memorial Arena	MTV2	0–1
2	June 8	Philadelphia Passion	Won, 20–19	1st Mariner Arena	MTV2	1–1
3	July 12	Cleveland Crush	Won in OT, 14–18	1st Mariner Arena	MTV2	2–1
4	November 18	@ Omaha Heart	Won, 12–6	Ralston Arena	MTV2	3–1
Playoff Semifinal	August 24	Philadelphia Passion	Lost, 20–19	Citizens Business Bank Arena	MTV2	3–2
