= Green Bay Chill =

Women's American football team, 2011–2014

Logo

General information
- Founded: 2011
- Folded: 2014
- Stadium: Resch Center; U.S. Cellular Arena
- Headquartered: Green Bay, Wisconsin; Milwaukee, Wisconsin
- Colors: Green, gold, white
- Website: www.lflus.com/greenbaychill/

Personnel
- Owners: Lingerie Football League, LLC
- Head coach: Gilbert Brown

League / conference affiliations
- Legends Football League

The Green Bay Chill was a women's American football team in the Legends Football League (formerly Lingerie Football League) that played from 2011 to 2014. The Chill played in Green Bay, Wisconsin, at the Resch Center from 2011 to 2013. In 2014, the team moved to Milwaukee, Wisconsin, with home games at U.S. Cellular Arena. Their first game in the 2014 season was set to take place in the U.S. Cellular Arena but it was rescheduled to July 12 citing lack of ticket sales. The July 12 game was the only Chill game played at the arena. The team was coached by former Green Bay Packer defensive tackle Gilbert Brown.

== 2014 roster ==
Green Bay Chill roster
Quarterbacks: 10 Rykki Casey; 19 Anne Erler; Running backs Receivers: 1 Taylor Haywood; 2 Jessica Peyton; 5 Danielle Jorgenson; 7 Cassie Anderson; 9 Amber McLellan; 11 Laure Gelis; 13 Anna Heasman; 15 Hallie Jiskra; 17 Amber Mane; 18 Theresa Garay; 20 Stephanie Ponzer	Offensive Linewomen: 3 Jennifer Freund; Defensive linewomen: 1 Taylor Haywood; 3 Jennifer Freund; 5 Danielle Jorgenson; 9 Amber McLellan; 15 Hallie Jiskra; 18 Theresa Garay	Linebackers: 10 Rykki Casey; Cornerbacks: 7 Cassie Anderson; 13 Anna Heasman; 20 Stephanie Ponzer; Safeties: 2 Jessica Peyton; 11 Laure Gelis; 17 Amber Mane; 19 Anne Erler; Roster updated 2014-11-01

== Schedules ==
=== 2011–2012 ===
Week	Date	Opponent	Score	Location	Television	Record
1	August 26	Minnesota Valkyrie	Lost, 25–28	Resch Center	MTV2	0–1
2	September 30	Seattle Mist	Lost, 8–42	Resch Center	MTV2	0–2
3	October 7	at Chicago Bliss	Won, 36–34	Toyota Park	MTV2	1–2
4	January 21	at Las Vegas Sin	Lost, 0–30	Orleans Arena	MTV2	1–3

=== 2013 ===
Week	Date	Opponent	Score	Location	Record
1	April 6	at Seattle Mist	Lost, 36–55	ShoWare Center	0–1
2	May 11	Minnesota Valkyrie	Won, 40–8	Resch Center	1–1
3	June 22	at Las Vegas Sin	Lost, 32–40	Orleans Arena	1–2
4	August 10	Chicago Bliss	Lost, 18–27	Resch Center	1–3

=== 2014 ===
Week	Date	Opponent	Score	Location	Record
1	April 5	Chicago Bliss	Cancelled	U.S. Cellular Arena	
2	May 2	at Seattle Mist	Lost, 24–38	ShoWare Center	0–1
3	May 15	at Las Vegas Sin	Lost, 24–34	Thomas & Mack Center	0–2
4	July 12	Chicago Bliss	Lost, 7–32	U.S. Cellular Arena	0–3
