= San Diego Seduction =

Logo

General information
- Founded: 2009
- Folded: 2011
- Stadium: San Diego Sports Arena
- Headquartered: San Diego, California
- Colors: Sky blue, yellow, white
- Website: www.lflus.com/sandiegoseduction/

Personnel
- Owners: Lingerie Football League, LLC
- Head coach: Pat Kelly

League / conference affiliations
- Lingerie Football League; Western Conference

The San Diego Seduction were a women's American football team based in San Diego, California, that competed in the Lingerie Football League (LFL). The team played its home games at the San Diego Sports Arena. The Seduction played in the league's inaugural 2009–10 season.

The team used the branding of the never launched San Francisco Seduction that was supposed to participate in the 2008 Lingerie Bowl. The franchise was suspended after the 2010–11 season, citing the venue as the main concern and leaving the option to return by the 2012–13 season. The team was never reactivated.

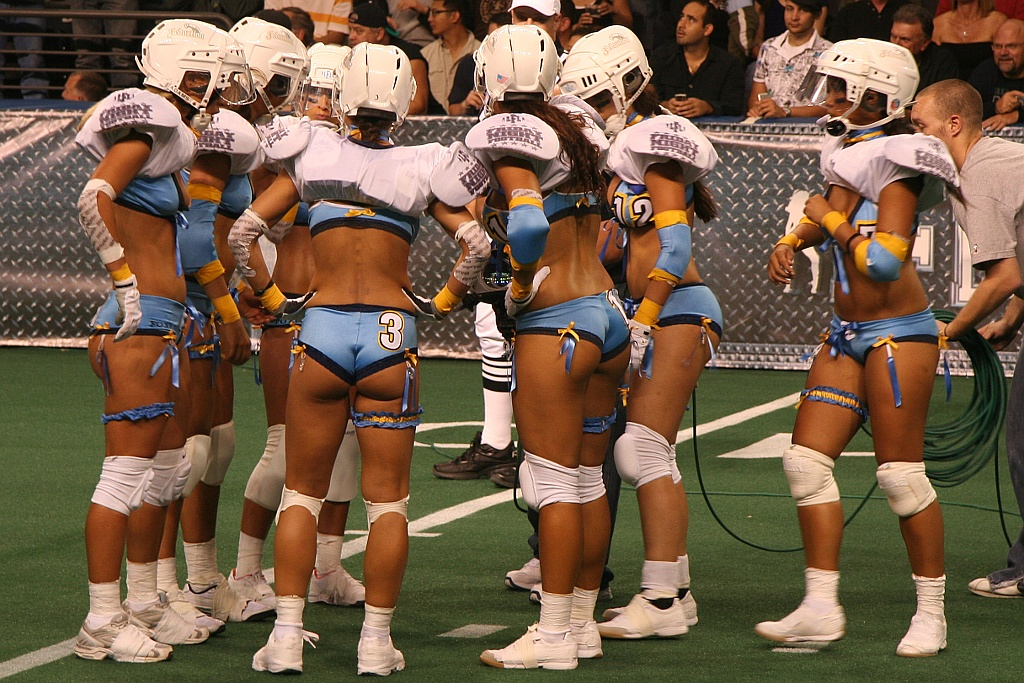
Seduction players in a huddle

== 2010–11 roster ==
San Diego Seduction roster
Quarterbacks: 10 Kelli Scarangelo; 17 Kindra Myers; Running backs: 2 Tamicka Estrella; 18 Aubreigh Hutchinson; Wide receiver: 4 Cassie McLean; 7 Jennilyn DeJesus; 9 Vanessa Neff; 12 Alex Carnoali; 14 Shannon Peterson; 16 Jennifer Frazer; 20 Natasha Lynch; Offensive linemen: 1 Audrey Lastko; 3 Jennifer Miller; 5 Estrella Alcaraz; 8 Amber Reed	Defensive linemen: 19 Torkwase Fraser; Linebackers currently vacant Defensive backs: 13 Christi Garcia; 15 Sarah Montes; Roster updated 2011-02-23

== Seasons ==
=== 2009–10 schedule ===
Date	Opponent	Location	Score	Record
September 11	at Seattle Mist	ShoWare Center	Lost, 6–20	0–1
October 16	Dallas Desire	San Diego Sports Arena	Lost, 6–40	0–2
January 8	Denver Dream	San Diego Sports Arena	Cancelled (Note: Ruled a "no contest"; both teams were already eliminated from playoff contention so the league cancelled the game to prevent unnecessary possible injury to players.)	
January 29	at Los Angeles Temptation	Los Angeles Memorial Coliseum	Lost, 0–53	0–3

=== 2010–11 schedule ===
Date	Opponent	Location	Score	Record
September 3	at Dallas Desire	Cotton Bowl	Won, 24–13	1–0
October 22	Seattle Mist	San Diego Sports Arena	Won, 26–25	2–0
November 13	at Chicago Bliss	Sears Centre	Lost, 12–50	2–1
January 1	Los Angeles Temptation	Valley View Casino Center (Note: The San Diego Sports Arena was renamed in November 2010.)	Lost, 6–18	2–2
