= Toledo Crush =

Logo

General information
- Founded: 2011
- Folded: 2014
- Stadium: Quicken Loans Arena (2011–2013); Huntington Center (2014)
- Headquartered: Cleveland, Ohio; Toledo, Ohio
- Colors: Orange, brown
- Website: www.lflus.com/toledocrush/

Personnel
- Owners: Legends Football League, LLC
- General manager: Jerrell Jones
- Head coach: Quentin Jones

League / conference affiliations
- Legends Football League

The Toledo Crush were a women's indoor football team in the Legends Football League, formerly known as the Lingerie Football League before 2013. The Crush began play for the 2011–12 season as the Cleveland Crush with home games at Quicken Loans Arena in downtown Cleveland, Ohio.

On December 16, 2013, Cleveland Scene reported that the team would relocate to Toledo, Ohio, as the Toledo Crush before the 2014 season. The Crush played their home games at the Huntington Center in downtown Toledo.

On January 27, 2015, the league stated that the Crush would be suspending operations and would relocate to another Ohio market by the 2017 season. The Crush were never revived.
