= Philadelphia Passion =

Logo

General information
- Founded: 2009
- Folded: 2013
- Stadium: Sun National Bank Center (2009–2012); PPL Park (2013)
- Headquartered: Trenton, New Jersey; Chester, Pennsylvania
- Colors: Midnight green, black
- Website: www.lflus.com/phillypassion/

Personnel
- Owners: Lingerie Football League, LLC

League / conference affiliations
- Legends Football League; Eastern Conference

The Philadelphia Passion was a women's American football team that played in the Legends Football League and were based in the Philadelphia metropolitan area.

The Passion was one of the ten inaugural teams established in 2009 as part of the Lingerie Bowl's expansion into a full-fledged league called the Lingerie Football League (LFL). They played their home games at the Sun National Bank Center in Trenton, New Jersey. The team advanced to the league's championship game, still called the Lingerie Bowl and taking place during the Super Bowl, in 2011 and 2012, losing to the Los Angeles Temptation both times. The league then postponed the 2012–13 season.

In 2013, the league rebranded as the Legends Football League and the team moved their home games to the outdoor PPL Park in Chester, Pennsylvania. The Passion qualified for their third straight championship, rebranded as the Legends Cup, and lost to the Chicago Bliss. The team was then suspended by the league in December 2013 and never returned.

== 2010–11 roster ==
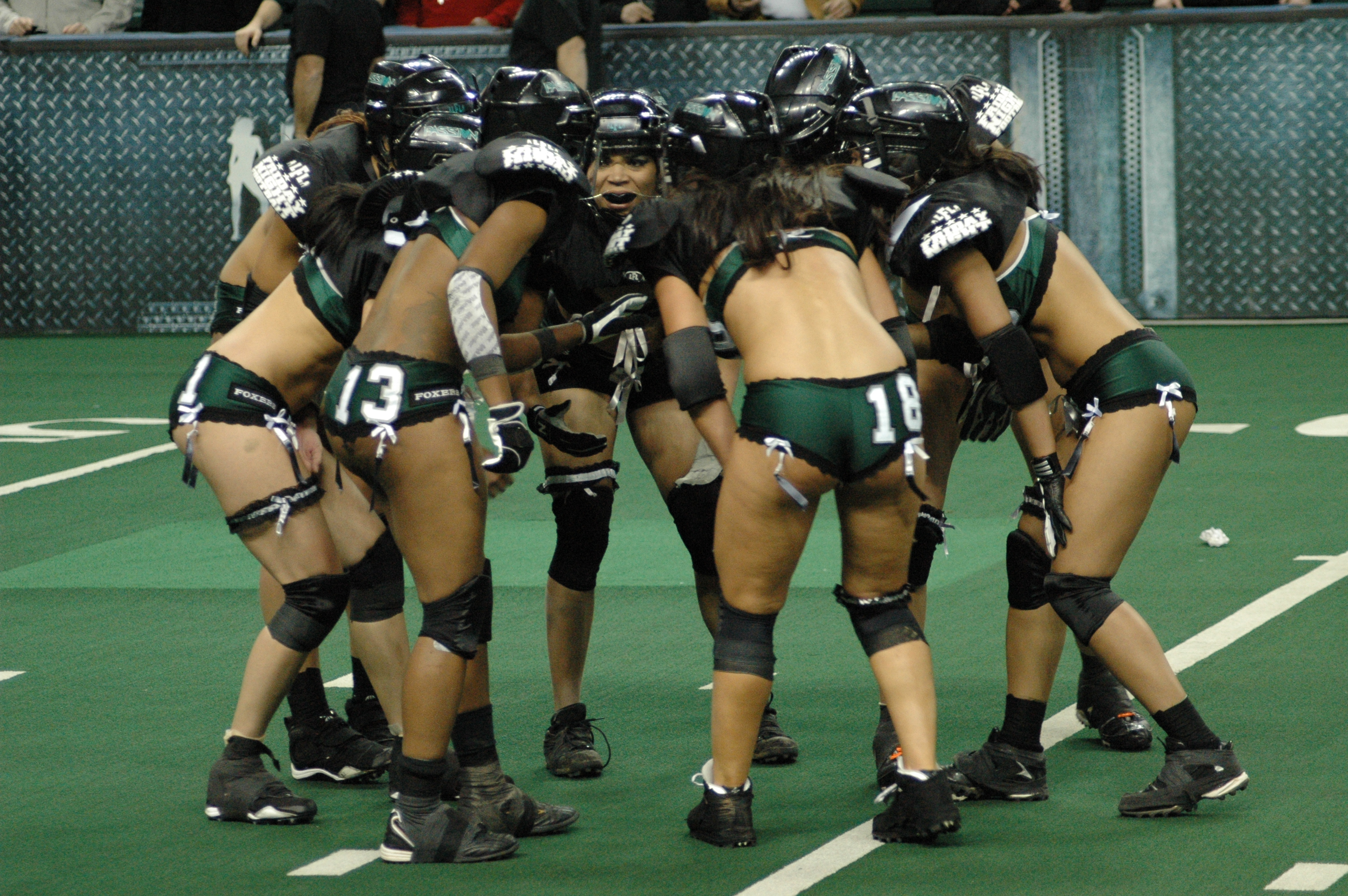
Members of the Passion huddle during a game in 2009

Philadelphia Passion roster
Quarterbacks: 1 Kia Davidson; 11 Christy Bell; Running backs: 6 Marirose Roach; 14 Jaleesa McCrary; Wide receivers: 2 Crystal Leach; 5 Danielle Gassler; 13 Tyrah Lusby; Offensive linewomen: 4 Lauren La Bella; 9 Angela Perfetto; 18 Megann Lawrence	Defensive linewomen: 12 Tanyka Henry; 19 Brittania; 20 Heather Roy; Linebackers: 3 Jenny Butler; 9 Angela Perfetto; Defensive backs: 7 Stephanie Orji; 15 Jena Weiiss; 16 Whitney Paronish; 17 Shanae Thomas; 8 Kate Osman; Roster updated 2011-03-04
