= Jacksonville Breeze =

Logo

General information
- Founded: 2009
- Folded: 2015
- Stadium: Tampa Bay Times Forum (2009–2012); Jacksonville Veterans Memorial Arena (2013–2014)
- Headquartered: Tampa, Florida; Jacksonville, Florida
- Colors: Red, black and white
- Website: www.lflus.com/jacksonvillebreeze/

Personnel
- Owners: Lingerie Football League, LLC
- Head coach: Yo Murphy

League / conference affiliations
- Legends Football League

The Jacksonville Breeze was a team in the Legends Football League based in Jacksonville, Florida. They played their home games at Jacksonville Veterans Memorial Arena.

The team originated as the Tampa Breeze in 2009, the inaugural year for the Lingerie Football League. They played their home games at Tampa Bay Times Forum in downtown Tampa, Florida. After three seasons, they relocated to Jacksonville in September 2012. However, the league postponed the 2012–13 season to spring 2013 and rebranded to the Legends Football League. Most of the team's players were recruited from the pool of local athletes.

On January 27, 2015, the LFL stated that the Breeze had suspended operations with plans to relaunch in another Florida market within the next three years.

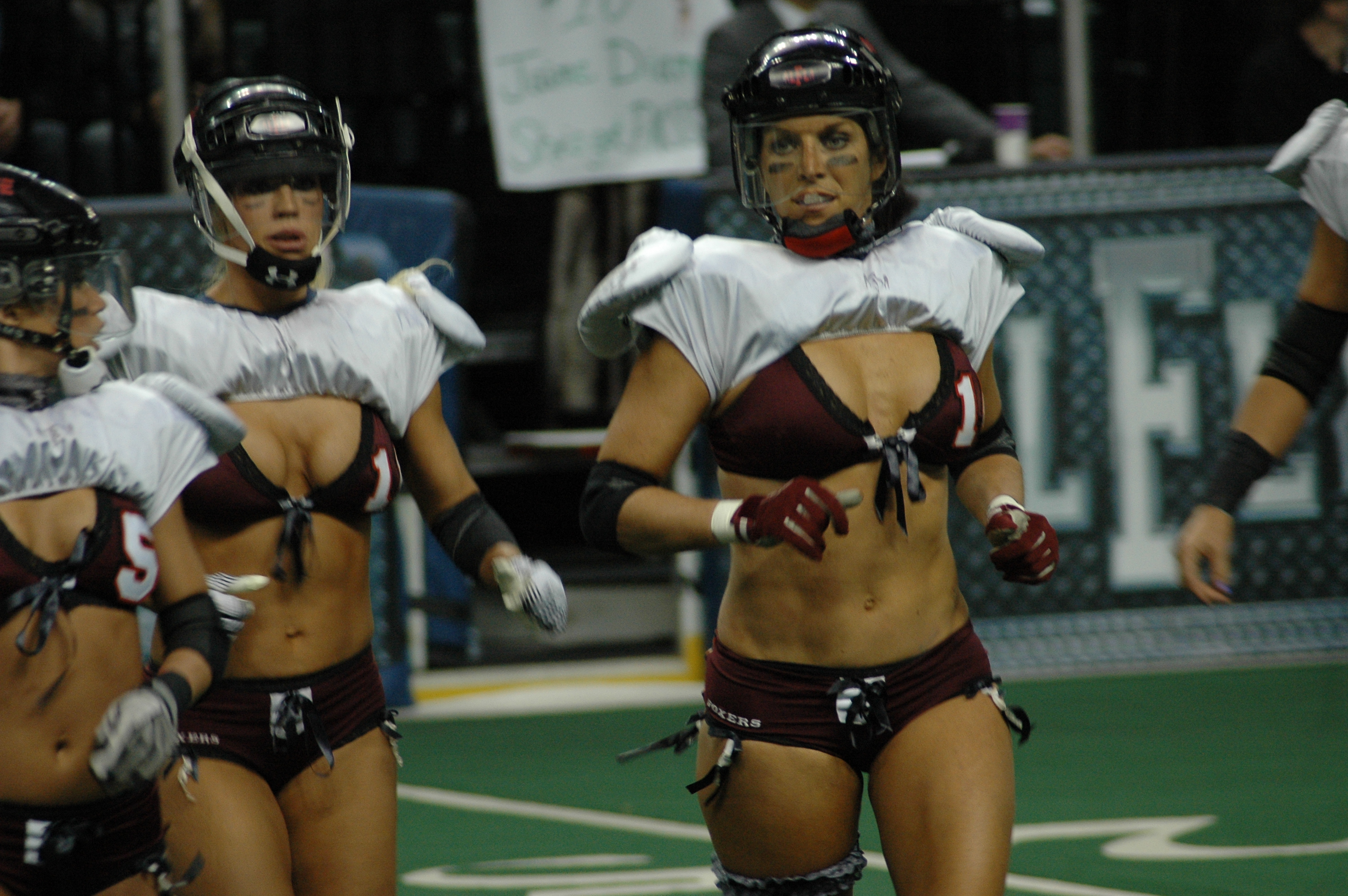
Members of the Tampa Breeze during a game in 2009
