= California Special Mustang =

Car

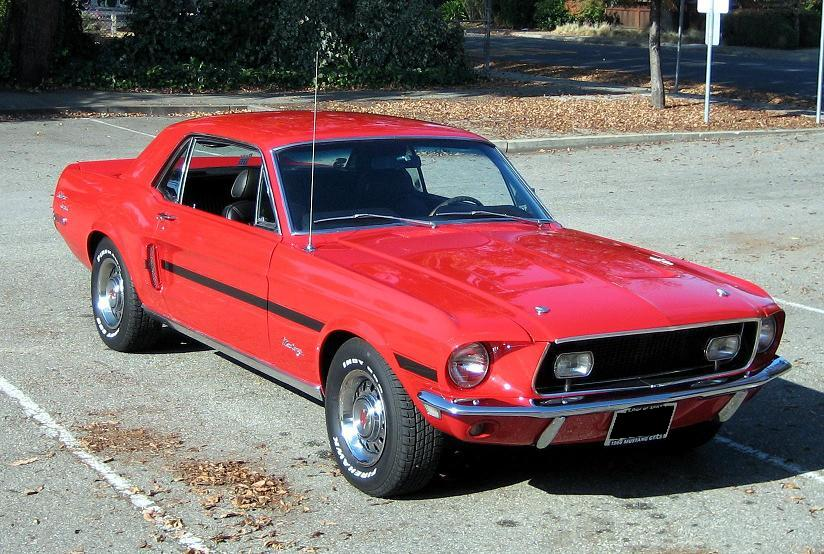
1968 California Special GT/CS - Front View

In mid-February 1968, the California Ford Dealers (Ford Dealer Advertising Fund) began to market a factory-built, limited-edition Mustang, called the GT/CS, or "California Special". The hope was for a targeted production run of 5,000; however, only 4,118 were made, including 251 units that were remarketed in Denver, Colorado, as "High Country Special '68". Production ran for only 5.5 months from mid-February 1968 to early August 1968. Today, classic car collectors consider these cars to be very desirable.

== Marketing theme ==
The marketing theme for this limited edition was "California Made it Happen!", a variation on Mustang's national marketing theme and commercial jingle, "Only Mustang Makes it Happen!"

This was all in response to the new pony car competition for the upcoming 1968 model year from the Camaro, Firebird, Javelin, and even from Ford's Torino and Mercury Cougar. The state of California, alone, was responsible for the sales of 20% of all Mustangs and Thunderbirds in the country, which gave the regional dealers there the clout to ask for and market their own Mustang.

Lee Grey was the Southern California district sales manager for Ford and he was looking for something unique to spark the sales of Mustangs in Los Angeles. Ford dealers had tried promotions like the "1967 Rainbow Colored Mustangs", as well as by adding accessories and options to dress up cars for public view. The objective was to make the Mustangs sold in California unique and to look "custom" made, thus differentiating them from the standard models available elsewhere.

== Shelby inspired ==
=== Little Red ===
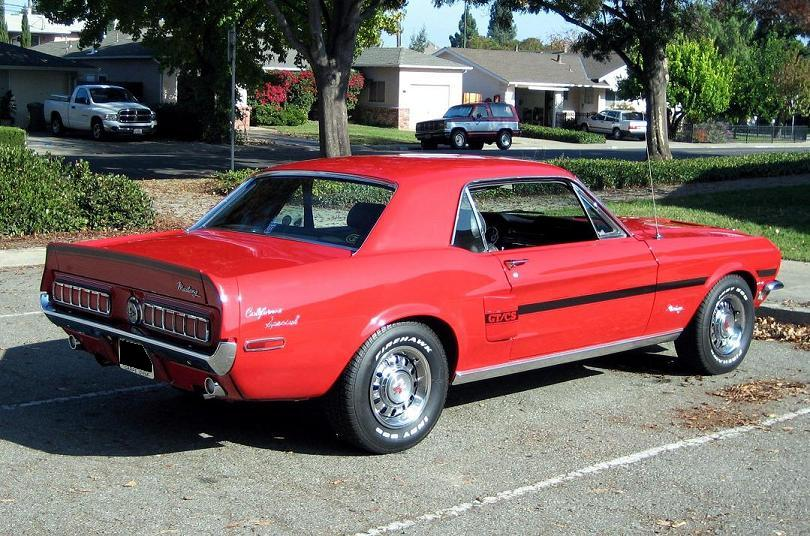
1968 California Special GT/CS - Rear View

Lee Grey attended the Ford Preview event for the new 1968 Fords at the Los Angeles Coliseum in August 1967, where he saw a Shelby GT-500 prototype coupe nicknamed "Little Red". This was a supercharged 428, C-6 automatic coupe that was dressed up in bright red paint, and a vinyl roof, as a formal, yet high-performance vehicle. It was on display to gauge market response as a possible Shelby lineup Mustang. Lee saw this as an opportunity to use the elements of this prototype to market his "California-Only Mustang". He met with Lee Iacocca in L.A., and the decision was made to bring the car to Dearborn to develop into a limited edition Mustang. First, it was known as the "GT/SC", as a nationally available Sport Coupe, then, after some discussion, developed as the GT/CS.

"Little Red" was long thought to have been crushed but was discovered in early 2018, after missing for over 50 years. Craig Jackson tracked it down using Fords registered VIN as opposed to using the Shelby VIN which had been used to track it up until this time in order to track down the vehicle. It was rotting away in an open field in Weatherford, Texas after being passed around by numerous owners. Plans are to restore "Little Red" to its previous glory.

=== Shelby automotive and the GT/CS ===
Shelby Automotive, now part of Ford, was assigned the task of designing and engineering the necessary parts and assembly procedures for the GT/CS. This was done right alongside the development of their 1968 Shelby. The fiberglass parts were crafted at A.O. Smith, in Ionia, Michigan, in steel molds. A.O. Smith was also the same OEM manufacturer for the Corvette fiberglass bodies. The fiberglass parts for the GT/CS included: the rear decklid and end caps, taillight panel, and side scoops (RH and LH).

=== Green Hornet ===
On April 4, 1968, during production of the GT/CS, a second Shelby coupe prototype, the "Green Hornet EXP-500", was built by Shelby Automotive based on a GT/CS purchased from Ford. The company wanted to test a number of developments, so it removed the 390-cubic-inch big-block V8 for a 428 CJ big-block V8 with Conelec fuel injection, a six-speed automatic designed in-house, an independent rear suspension, disc brakes at all corners, and side stripes.

"Little Red" and the "Green Hornet" were the only two Shelby coupes produced (other than the race-only '67 coupes). Both were prototypes. All other Shelby Mustangs were either fastbacks or convertibles. "Green Hornet" has been kept in good condition.

The Green Hornet Mustang was later owned by Barrett-Jackson Chairman and CEO Craig Jackson, and went on sale at Barrett-Jackson 2013 Scottsdale auction, but the sales failed when the high bid of $1.8 million was lower than the consigner's reserve price. In Nerve Center episode 'Barrett-Jackson Collector Car Auction', it was revealed the reserve price was $2.5 million.

== Features ==
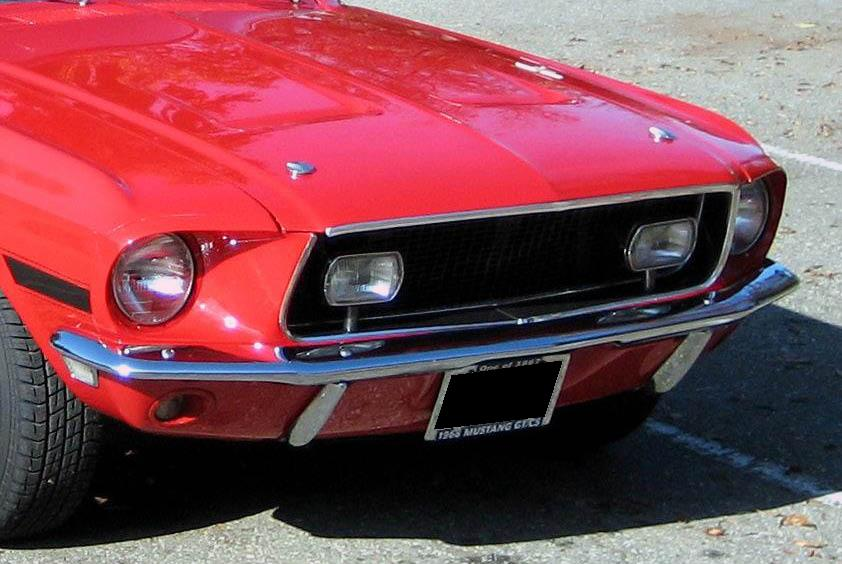
GT/CS Hood Locks and Fog Lamps

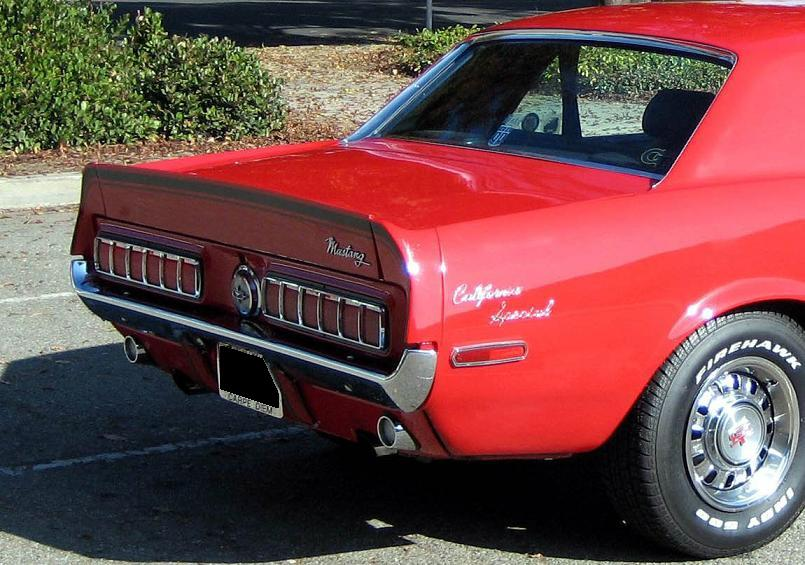
GT/CS Taillights

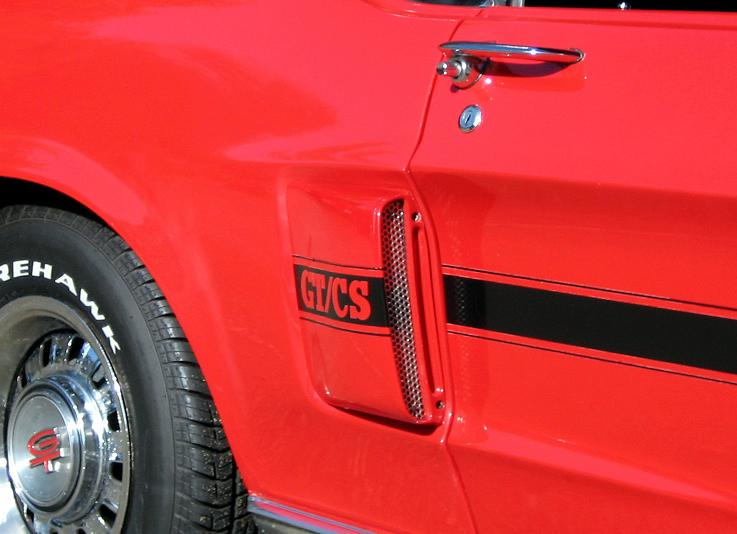
GT/CS Side Scoop

The Mustang GT/CS features included: Marchal or Lucas Fog Lights, twist-type DZUS hood pins, side scoops, pop-open gas cap, rear spoiler decklid with end caps, and taillight panel with 1965 Thunderbird taillights (non sequential). Side stripes with the "GT/CS" die-cut logo, along with a rear decklid stripe were included, and were available in white, black, red, and metallic medium blue only. It was available in all standard Mustang colors for 1968, all Ford engine and transmission combinations (except 427/C-6, which was dropped for all '68s).

Most produced were the small-block 289 two-barrel (2V) carburetor with C-4 automatic transmission. All regular production factory and dealer options for 1968 Mustang coupes were also available for the GT/CS, other than options that would conflict with the GT/CS package, such as fog lights or C-stripes. The GT option package was available on the GT/CS so some, but not all, GT/CSs are also GTs. The "GT" in GT/CS has nothing to do with the GT package.

== Target market ==
Distribution of the Mustang GT/CS was primarily within the two California sales districts (DSOs 71 & 72); but was expanded to sales districts in Washington, Nevada, Texas, Utah, Oklahoma, Arizona, Western Canada, and Colorado (as the High Country Special).

Some of the lowest production cars are those that have the 390 cubic inches (6.4 L) big-block and 428 cubic inches (7.0 L) Cobra Jet 428 V8 engines. GT/CS features design cues from the Shelby GT combined with the typical Mustang hardtop coupe chassis.

== Timeline ==
- Jan '67: Shelby experimental coupe "Little Red" built from a '67 Mustang coupe
- Sep '67: Regular 1968 Mustang production begins.
- Oct '67: Lee Grey visits Shelby American to borrow Little Red for one week. Lee Grey wants to buy parts from A.0. Smith to modify Mustang coupes at L.A. area dealerships.
- Oct '67: Lee Grey meets with Lee Iacocca to discuss a Mustang for California. Little Red is there to illustrate his idea.
- Dec '67-Jan '68: Shelby Automotive requested by Ford to develop "California Special." California Mustang gets approval and marketing money (initial order for 6,180 GT/CS parts sets).
- February 17, '68: Production of GT/CS cars at Ford begins, a few coupes dated as early as December 28, 1967 used.
- February 22, '68: First dealer advertising of GT/CS availability, Coberly Ford, L.A.
- March 15–20, '68: Heavy production of GT/CS at San Jose (many special order cars).
- Apr '68: Shelby Automotive's second coupe prototype "Green Hornet" built from a GT/CS bought by Shelby.
- Mid-Apr '68: GT/CS production begins for other sales districts in the west.
- Jun-Jul '68: High Country Specials produced for Denver District.
- July 30, '68: End of GT/CS (HCS) production.
- Sep '68: 1969 model year Mustang production begins.
- April–October 1987 California Edition introduced as a limited run in both V6 and V8 engines

== 2007-2009 GT/California Special ==
As a tribute to the 1968 California Special, Ford added a limited production factory GT/California Special in 2007. The GT/CS is based on a Mustang GT with a 4.6 liter engine. The GT/CS option adds 2 tone seats (Dove or Parchment inserts), unique floor mats, side stripes (with GT/CS behind the front wheel RH and LH), side scoops (behind doors), 18" polished aluminum wheels, rolled exhaust tips, faux gas cap (with words "California Special"), lowered front bumper/valance and unique rear bumper. The GT/CS was available as a coupe or convertible, with manual or automatic transmission. The GT/California Special package had an MSRP of $1,895.00.

The 2007 colors (All side GT/CS stripes were black (85X)):

- Redfire (G2)
- Vista Blue (G9)
- Performance White (HP)
- Black (UA)
- Grabber Orange (U3)

The 2008 colors (All side GT/CS stripes were black (85X)):

- Vista Blue (G9)
- Performance White (HP)
- Dark Candy Apple Red (JV)
- Grabber Orange (U3)
- Black (UA)

The 2009 colors (GT/CS stripes were black (85X) or white (852)):

- Vista Blue (G9)
- Performance White (HP)
- Dark Candy Apple Red (JV)
- Black (UA)
- Vapor Silver (ZY)

The same front and rear fascias (bumper covers) for the GT/CS were used on the Shelby GT-H and Shelby GT (see 2006-2007 Shelby GT-H).

== 2011-2012 Mustang GT/California Special ==
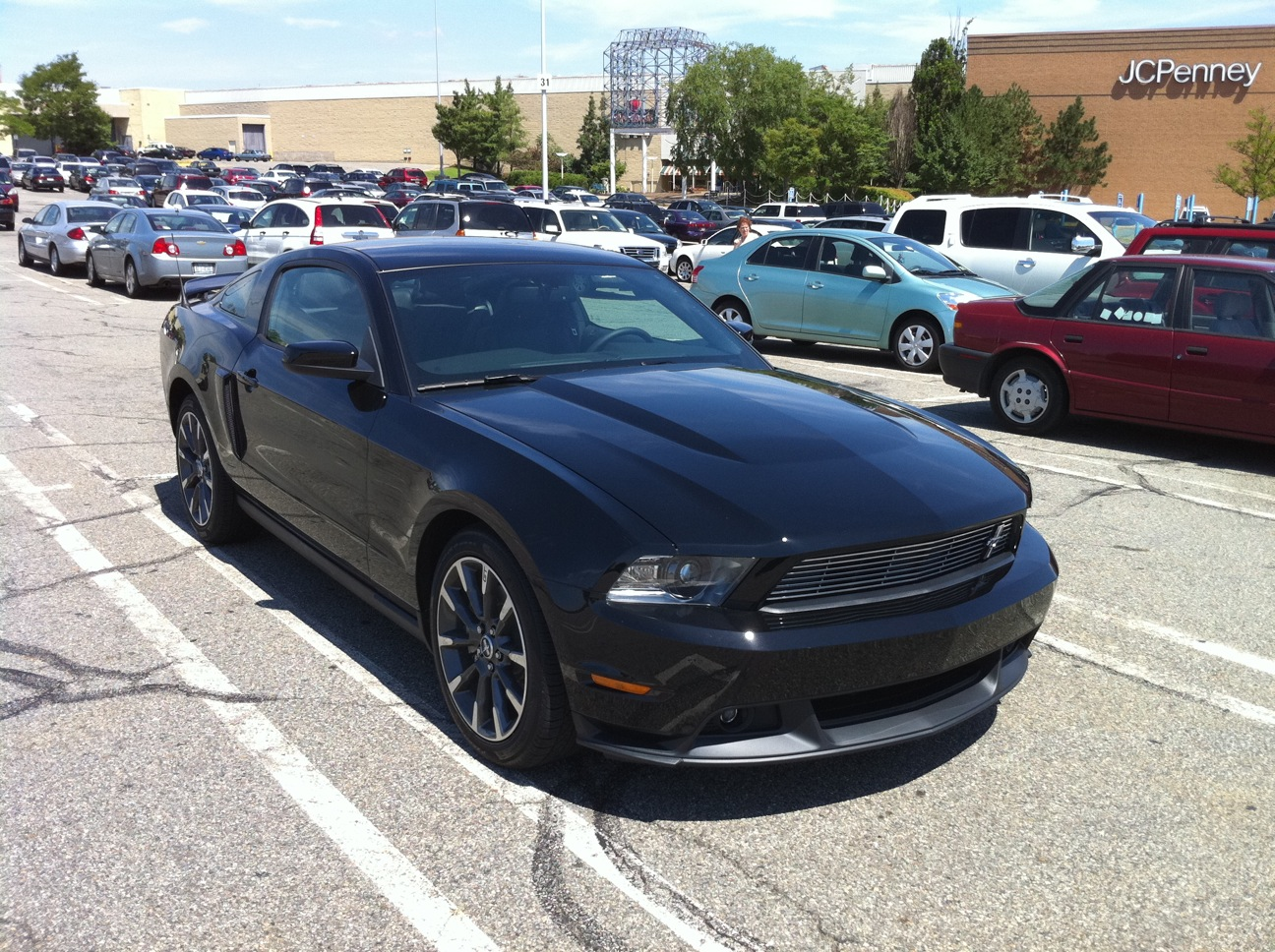
2011 California Special GT/CS

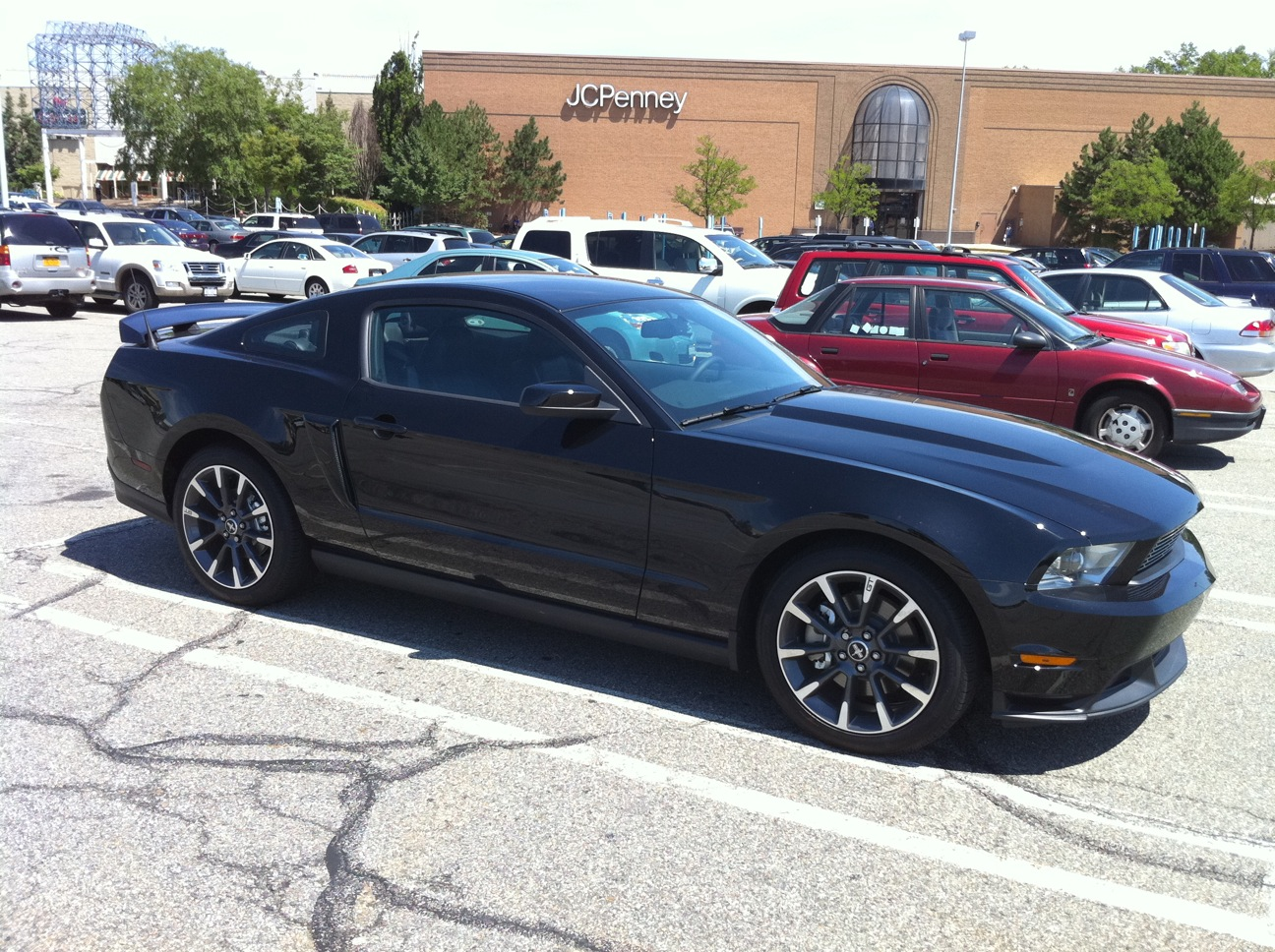
2011 California Special GT/CS side

In 2010, Ford reintroduced the California Special package for its 2011 Mustang GT models. The new California Special Package (402A) is the first built on a 5.0 liter engine in a Mustang GT. The 2011 California Special package 402A includes a unique chrome billet grille with a tri-color Mustang pony logo, for 2012, Ford replaced the chrome billet grille with a black plastic unit that retained the tri-bar Mustang logo, GT/CS faded side stripes, unique lower fascia with fog lights, unique "GT" 19-inch rims with 245-45/19 tires, California Special decklid "faux" gas cap emblem, premium GT/CS floormats, pedestal rear spoiler, unique rear fascia, California Special interior with unique carbon finish on door panels, instrument panel and leather seats. Available in coupe or convertible body styles with a manual or automatic transmission. The option for the 402A California Special Package is US$1,950.00.

The 2011 colors (faded GT/CS side stripes are black or stripe delete)

- Black
- Race Red
- Red Candy Metallic with tinted clearcoat
- Performance White
- Ingot Silver Metallic
- Grabber Blue

2012 included all of the colors available in 2011 along with the addition of

- Yellow Blaze

== 2013-2014 California Special ==
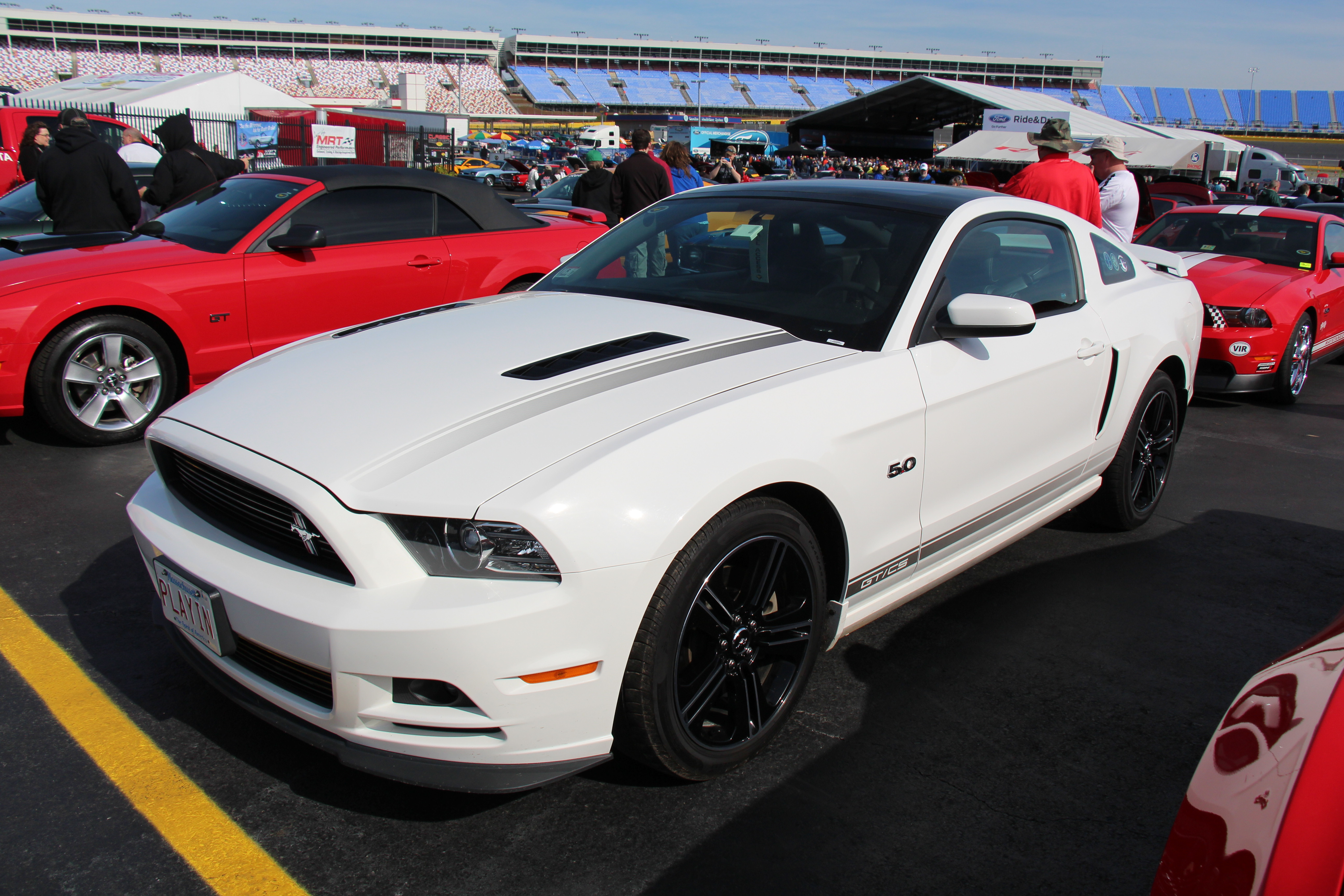

Along with the body redesign and the 420 hp in the 2013 Mustang, the GT/CS also received a slight update. The side stripe was moved from the middle of the door to the bottom of the body in the same location as the GT500 side stripe. The stripe was also featured along the body lines on the hood of the car. The heat extractors now featured on the 2013 Mustang GT's hood are painted black instead of body color. The 19" wheels are also black with chrome accent and a 5-spoke design. The interior was updated with Alcantara-style inserts in the seats and doors where the 2011/12 model year sported a faux carbon fiber pattern. The package cost US$1,995.00.

== 2016-2017 California Special ==
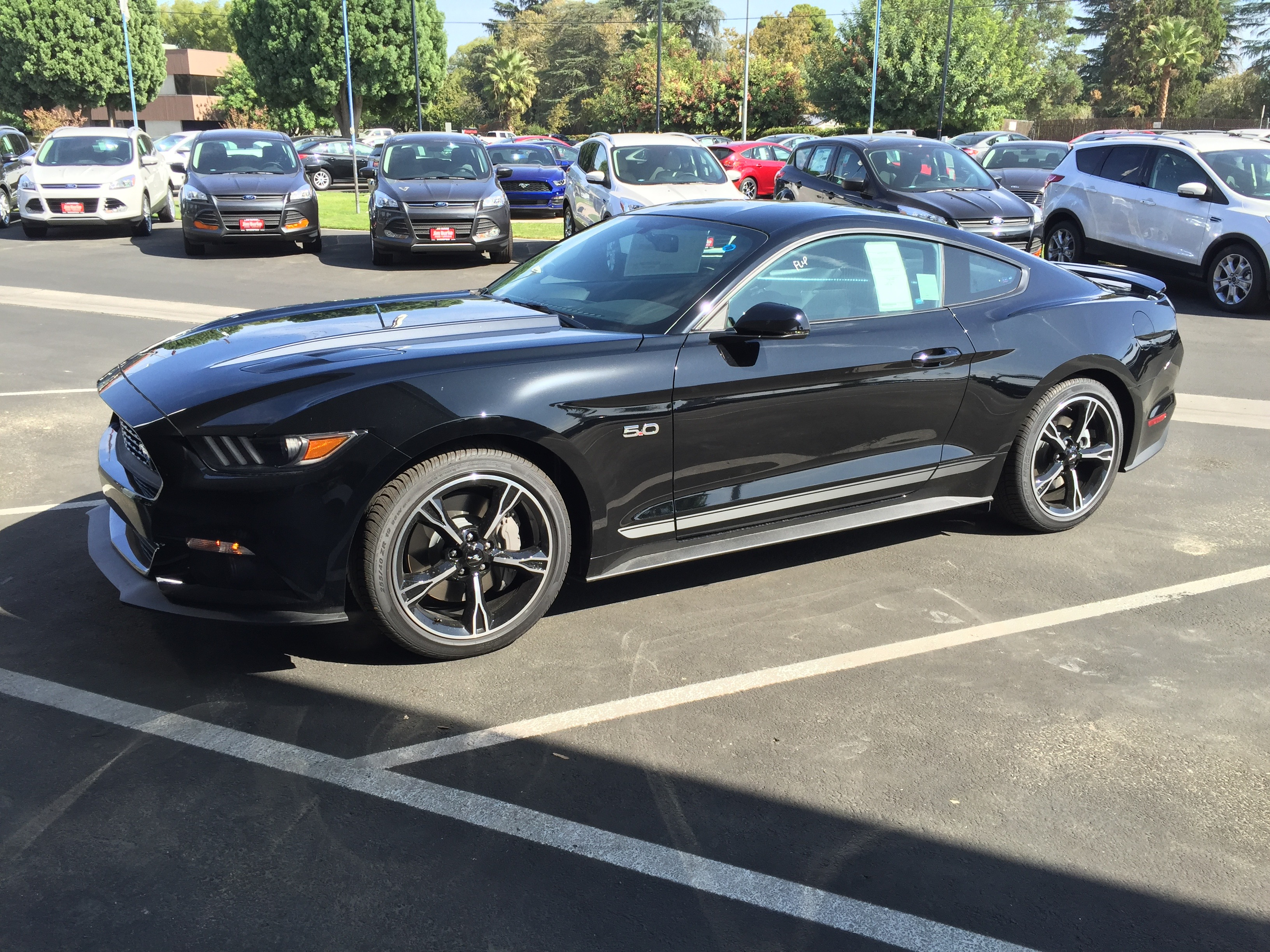
2016 Mustang GT/CS

When Ford introduced the newly modeled Mustang in 2015, it did not offer the California Special Edition package. However, a mere year later, Ford brought back the highly sought after package when it debuted the 2016 model. The 2016 Mustang GT/CS offers 435 hp stock with a 6-speed automatic transmission as well as a manual. One of the signature additions to the GT/CS package are the Ebony Leather/Miko Suede Seat Inserts with Red Contrast Stitching and Embossed Logo. Under the hood is a performance strut tower brace with the special "California Special" badge.

== 2019-2023 California Special ==
For 2019, Ford reintroduced the California Special Package as an option on GT Premium models, with option code 54C. The California Special package features the same powertrain options as the normal GT, with a 460-hp Coyote V8 mated to either a six-speed manual transmission or a ten-speed automatic transmission. The interior is mostly unchanged from the 2016-2017 edition, with the notable difference being the addition of Ford's digital instrument cluster and a revised SYNC system.

Additional features include "California Special" floormats, a unique spoiler, 19" machined aluminum wheels, a faux gas cap with GT/CS badging on the rear decklid, side scoops, and a unique GT/CS side stripe. Notably, the GT/CS features a revised front fascia that lacks the "prancing horse" logo of other Mustangs, instead replacing it with a red GT/CS logo. Deviating from other GTs, the GT/CS also lacks the 5.0 badge on the front quarter panels. Standard performance options include the front splitter from the GT Performance Pack, as well as a strut tower brace with GT/CS badging. This version of the GT/CS was available from the factory with the Performance Pack (option code 67G).

== 2024 California Special ==
Coinciding with 60 years of Mustang production, and the launch of the new S650 Mustang, Ford announced that the California Special package would return for the 2024 model year, primarily as an appearance package.

== Bibliography ==
- Newitt, Paul, GT/California Special Recognition Guide and Owner's Manual, 1989.
