= WestWorld =

Events facility in Scottsdale, Arizona

WestWorld of Scottsdale
- WestWorld
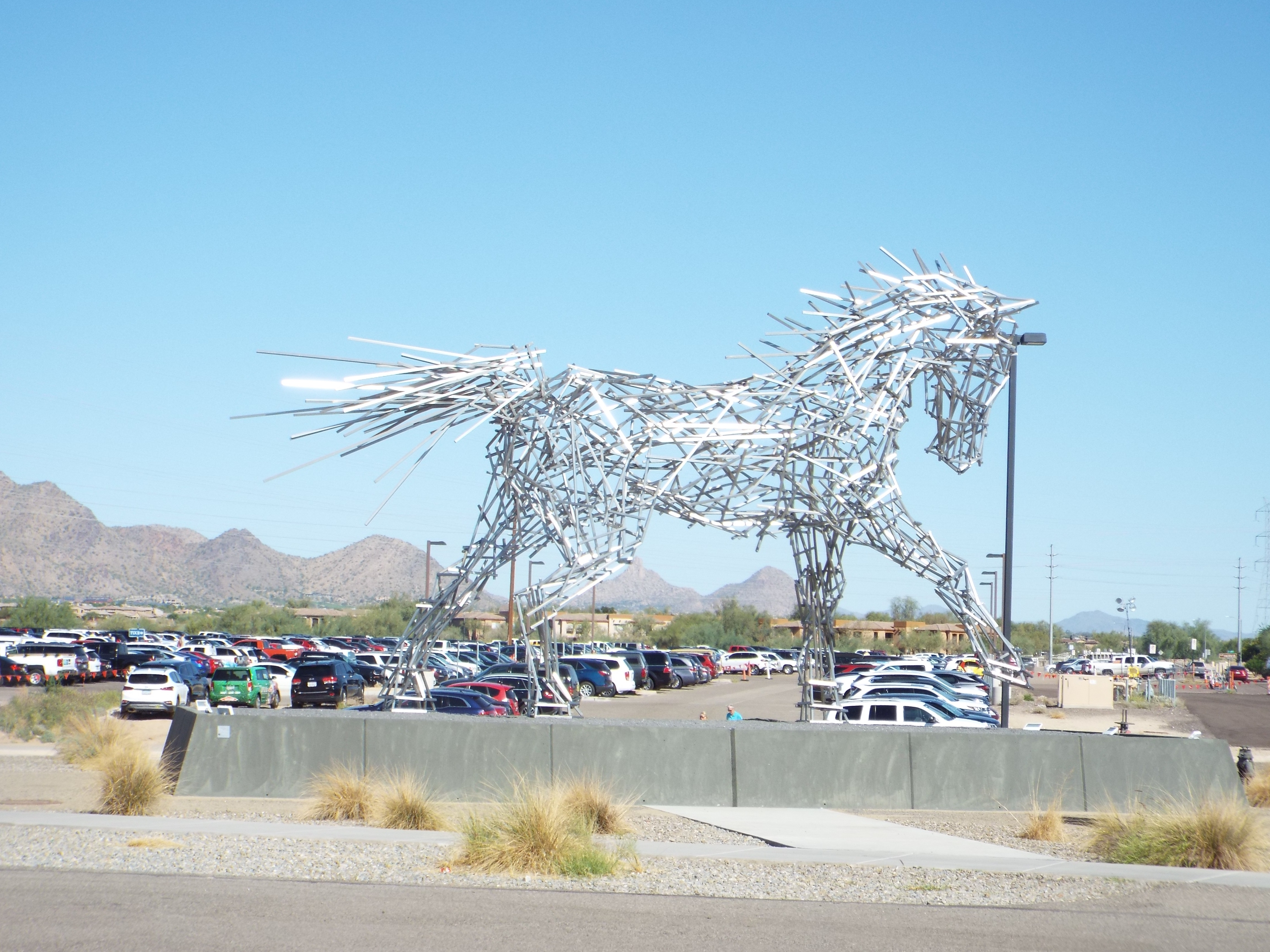
- "Impulsion"
- Interactive map of WestWorld of Scottsdale
- Address: 16601 N. Pima Rd
- Location: Scottsdale, Arizona
- Coordinates: 33.6330°N 111.8824°W
- Owner: United States Bureau of Reclamation
- Operator: City of Scottsdale
- Capacity: Tony Nelson Equestrian Center Equidome Permanent Seating: 3,400; Wendell Arena Seating: 6,756
- Type: multi-use events facility
- Acreage: 386

Construction
- Built: 1987

Tenants
- Barrett-Jackson Classic Car Auction; Parada del Sol Rodeo (PRCA); Scottsdale Arabian Horse Show; Good Guys Car Show; International Motorcycle Show; International Sportsmen's Expo

Website
- www.westworldaz.com

WestWorld of Scottsdale, popularly shortened to WestWorld, is a multi-use events facility in Scottsdale, Arizona. Westworld annually hosts the Barrett-Jackson Classic Car Auction, the Maricopa County Home Shows, and Scottsdale Arabian Horse Show, as well as conventions, trade shows, concerts, equestrian shows and other events. Roughly 100 events occur each year at WestWorld. It is located on 386 acres at the base of the McDowell Mountains. It was built in stages starting in 1987 on land owned by the United States Bureau of Reclamation and consists of the following facilities:

- A 120,460-square-foot (11,191 m^{2}) Multi-Purpose Tent which is the largest clear span tent structure in North America and measures up to 89 feet from floor to ceiling.
- The 330,000 square feet (30,658 m^{2}) climate controlled Tony Nelson Equestrian Center which includes a 120,000 square feet (11,148 m^{2}), 3,400 permanent seat Equidome, 117,000 square feet (10,870 m^{2}) North exhibition hall and 37,000 square feet (3,437 m^{2}) South exhibition hall.
- Wendell Arena, a 6,756-seat stadium used for horse shows, rodeos, and sometimes high-school football.
- 9 outdoor arenas
- 12 acre turf field
- Monterra banquet facility
- 470+ RV spaces with electric and water

The complex also contains various paved and unpaved parking lots for events and event attendee parking.

== See also ==
- List of convention centers in the United States
- List of historic properties in Scottsdale, Arizona
