= Vinyl roof =

Vehicular design element

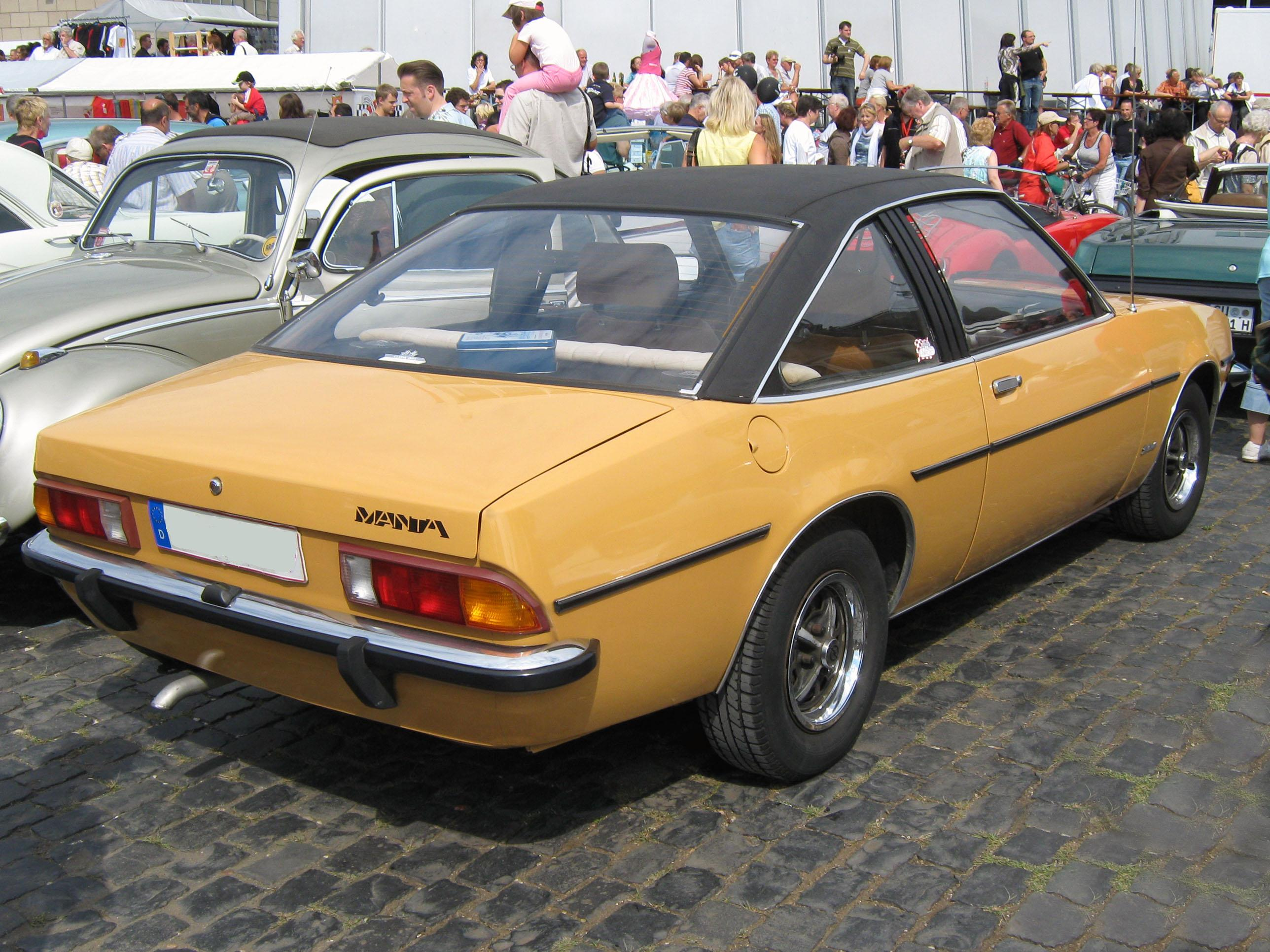
1975 Opel Manta with factory fitted vinyl roof

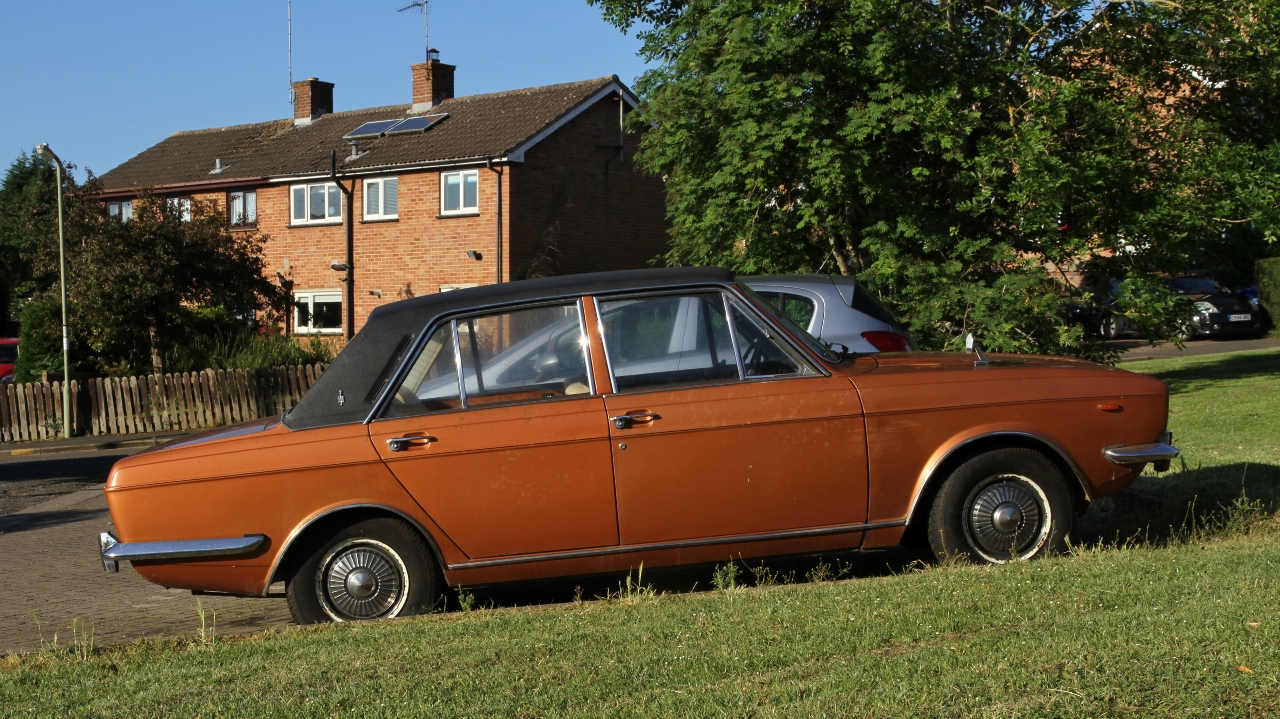
1971 Humber Sceptre MK III with factory fitted vinyl roof

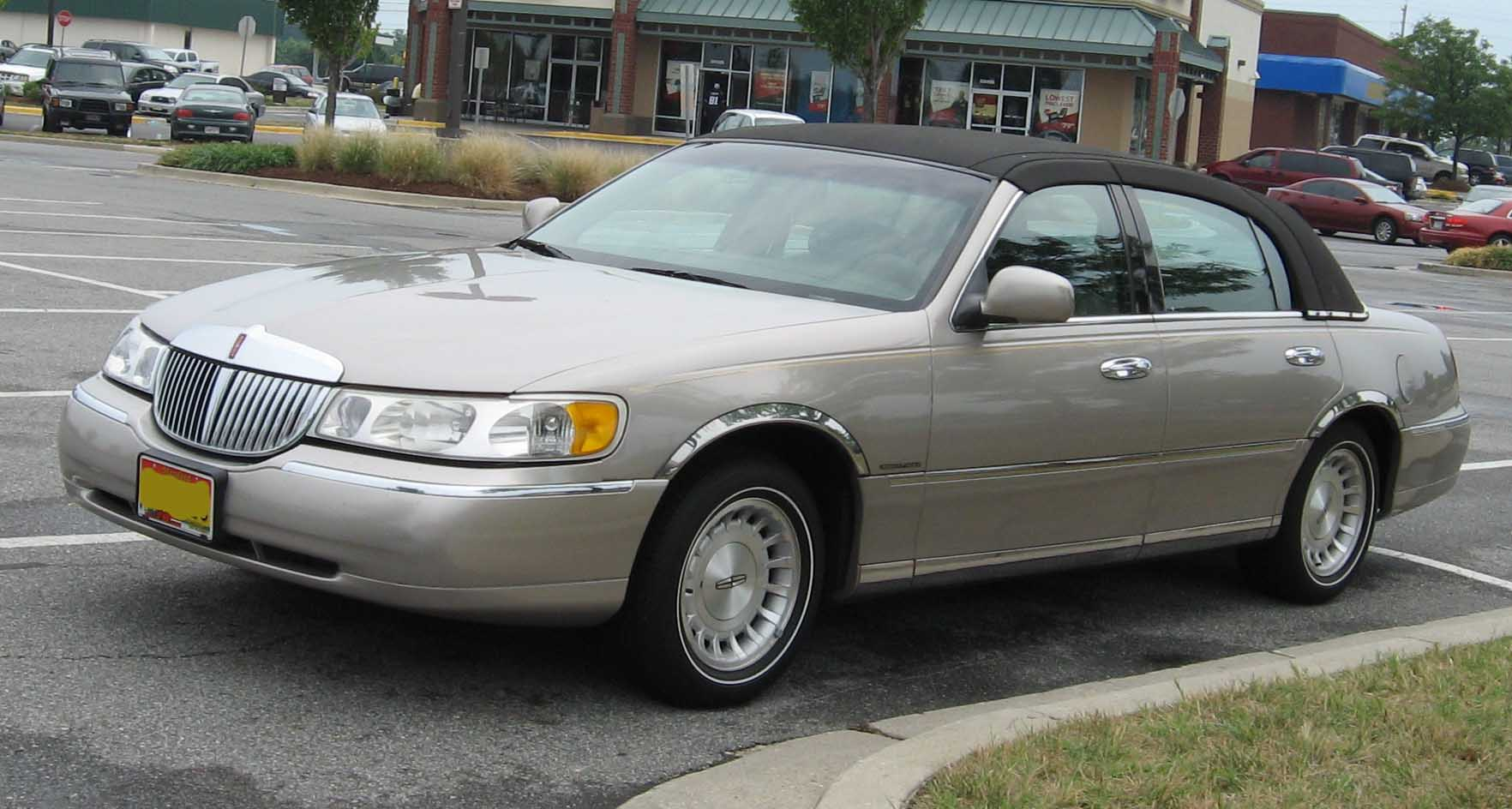
Lincoln Town-Car with vinyl roof

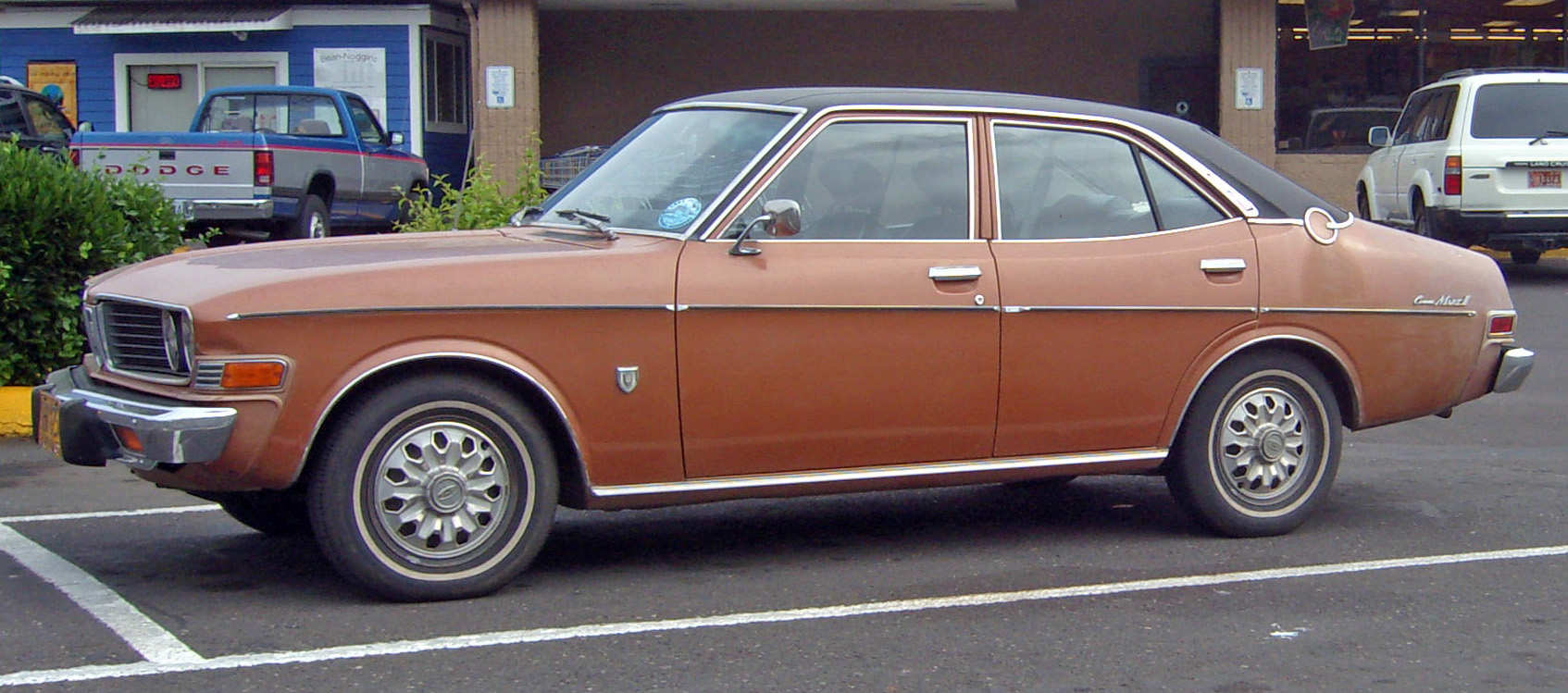
1976 Toyota Corona Mark II

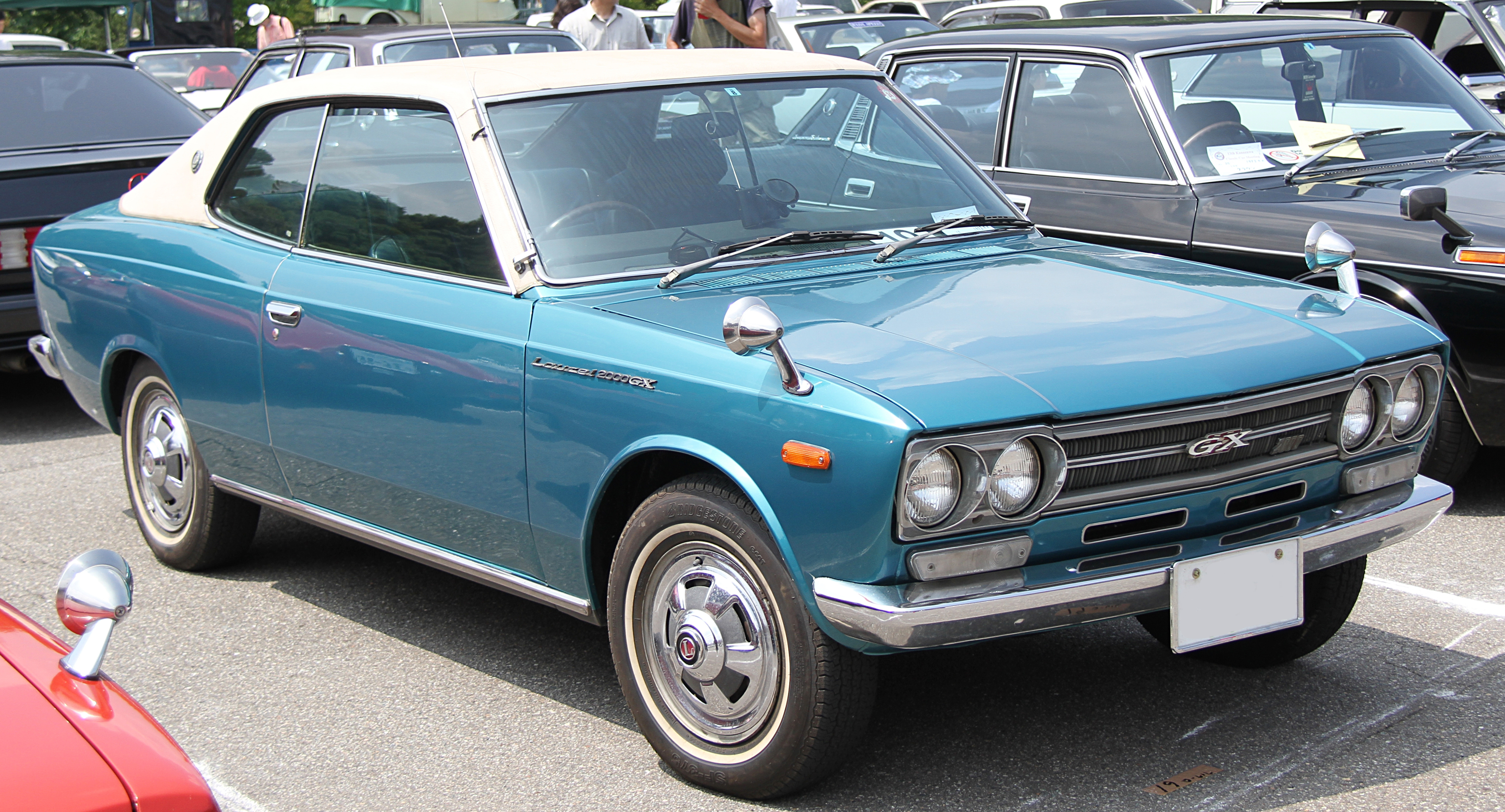
1972 Nissan Laurel

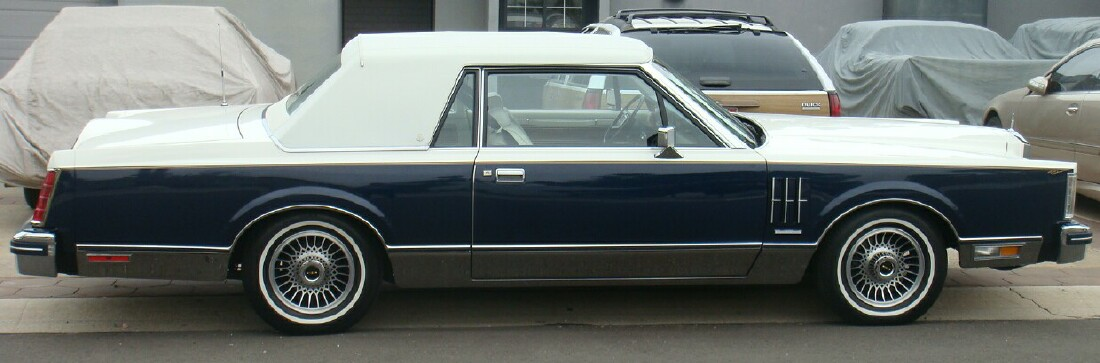
1980 Lincoln Mark VI with canvas look

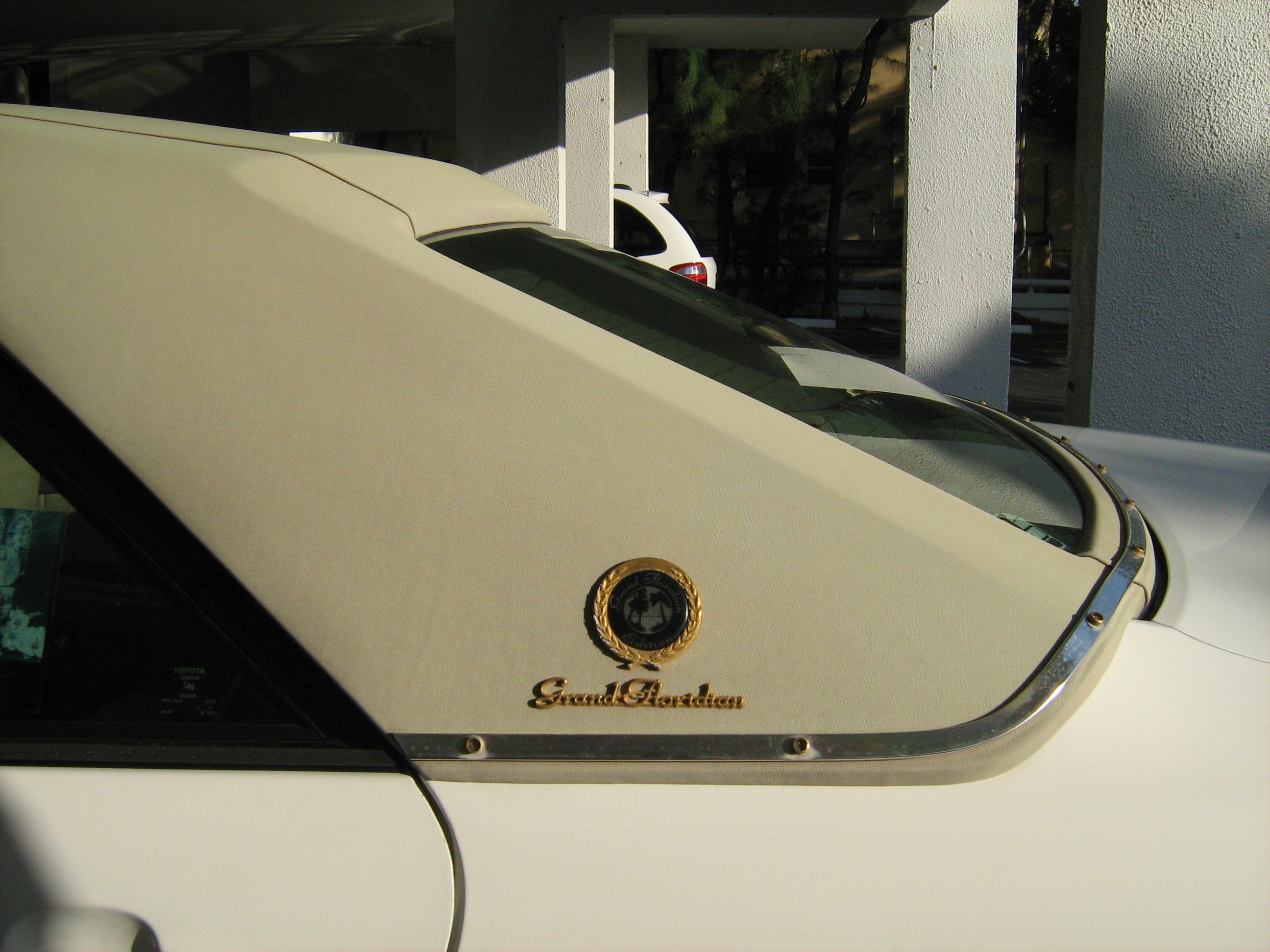
"Grand Floridian" aftermarket top on a Toyota

A Vinyl roof is a vinyl covering for an automobile's top.

This covering was originally designed to give the appearance of a convertible to models with a fixed roof, but eventually evolved into a styling statement in its own right. Vinyl roofs were most popular in the North American market, and they are considered one of the period hallmarks of the 1970s domestic cars. Vinyl roofs were also popular on European- (especially UK-) and Japanese-built cars during the 1970s, and tended to be applied to sporting or luxury trim versions of standard saloon (sedan) models.

== History ==
The vinyl roof cover was during the 1920s as a necessity to keep precipitation from occupants of the car. Other materials included leather and canvas. Some coverings replicated the appearance of a movable top, similar to those on horse carriages, along with landau bars.

The use of vinyl to cover the roofs of regular automobiles was to "give fixed-roof cars some of the flair and appeal of their convertible counterparts." An example is the 1928 - 1929 Ford Model "A" Special Coupe, featuring a roof completely covered with a vinyl-like material. This Model "A" Special Coupe's vinyl roof had two exposed seams on the back corners, with a lateral seam on the top covered with a narrow trim strip.

The technique fell out of favor in the 1930s as painted steel was considered a better roof. Smoother, pontoon bodies began to be fashionable with metal.

After World War II, the first example of using a fabric-covered top as a styling element, rather than a functional accessory, was the 1949 Kaiser Virginian. This four-door sedan model was a fixed-roof version of the Kaiser Manhattan four-door convertible and the roof was covered with the same nylon fabric as the convertible.

The pillarless hardtop body style was introduced to resemble convertibles. Because Ford did not have a hardtop body style offered by General Motors and Chrysler, a vinyl-covered roof was optional on the 1950 two-door Ford Crestliner, Mercury Monterey, and Lincoln Lido models as an effort to simulate the look of a convertible. This was not popular and the vinyl-covered models were discontinued the following year as Ford introduced pillarless hardtop models for 1951.

Kaiser Motors introduced a unique trim option in 1951 for their all-new full-size four-door sedans. The interior vinyl upholstery featured simulated reptile pattern and an optional padded vinyl covered roof with a lizard skin pattern that was named "Dinosaur." The automaker introduced a special luxury model, the Kaiser Dragon for the 1953 model year. In addition to numerous standard equipment and features such as 14-karat gold plated hood ornament and nameplates, the cars special upholstery and padded roof now featured a grass-patterned "Bambu" vinyl.

Lincoln simulated the appearance of a convertible on some Cosmopolitan coupes in the 1950s, as did the Kaiser on Manhattan sedans, although the material was still canvas as was used on the folding tops of convertibles of the time instead of vinyl.

For the 1959 model year, the Chrysler's Imperial featured a Landau top and the 1959 Desoto Adventurer Sportsman hardtop had a full roof that was not covered with vinyl, but both models had a textured black paint that was designed to look like leather.

An early modern vinyl roof was the 1956 Cadillac Eldorado Seville that came standard with a roof covered in an early vinyl material called "Vicodec" which was simply diamond point convertible fabric. The recommended cleaning methods were the same for the Eldorado as regular convertible tops. The fabric was applied over a thin pad with two parallel seams running the length of the roof to mimic the appearance of a convertible model. Sales were low, but the Eldorado Seville with its vinyl roof was produced until 1960.

Ford followed a few years later with a vinyl roof option on the 1962 Ford Thunderbird that also re-introduced landau bars as a styling element. The vinyl covering proved popular, and some form of vinyl trim would be seen on Thunderbird roofs for the next two decades.

Other manufacturers followed. Vinyl appeared on some coupe models in GM's 1962 full-size line. Chrysler made a vinyl roof available on the Dodge Dart. Ford offered it on the Mustang. By mid-decade, four-door sedans, as well as coupes and station wagons offered by all automakers could be topped with several colorful types of vinyl.

Vinyl-covered roofs became very common in most car classes by the late-1960s. Vinyl was produced that mimicked other materials such as canvas, and even alligator or snake hide. Chrysler briefly produced some patterns, with paisley or floral designs – this was called the "Mod Top" option. The Mercury Cougar briefly offered a houndstooth pattern. There was even an aftermarket spray-on product that claimed to add that factory vinyl look. By 1972, even the Ford Pinto offered a vinyl roof option.

At about that same time, the modern opera window first appeared, and it went so well with a vinyl surround that the two together became emblematic of American body design in the 1970s. During this period, vinyl with padding under it was sometimes used, allowing the top to somewhat mimic the feel as well as the look of a genuine convertible.

European and Japanese manufacturers offered vinyl-covered roofs. Chrysler's European-built cars used it on upmarket models of its Hunter and Avenger saloons. Ford had vinyl roofs on its European Escorts, Cortinas, Taunuses, and Granadas into the early 1980s. British Leyland had vinyl roofs on the last Wolseley and top-end Princess models and the feature was optional for all other models. Volvo featured a standard vinyl top on its most luxurious two-door 262 C coupe. Toyota adopted vinyl roofs for its Corona Mark II, Crown and Century sedans in the mid-1970s, and they could be found on Nissan Laurels, Cedrics, and Glorias.

Vinyl-covered roofs continued to appear in many car lines through the 1980s, but the coming of the "aero look," first introduced to the U.S. market by the 1983 Thunderbird, tended to militate against both opera windows and vinyl roofs, as their more formal style did not go well with the sleek profile designers were beginning to emphasize. Canvas-look tops, often called cabriolet roofs, with simulated convertible top bows under the fabric, gained some popularity. The availability of all vinyl styles dwindled in the 1990s, until the 2002 Lincoln Continental offered one of the last factory-applied versions.

Hearse and limousine bodies almost universally still have vinyl tops. Not only are they part of the expected style of those vehicles, but they have a practical advantage in covering up the welded body seams that result when standard sedans are stretched to greater length.

Aftermarket customizers also continue to install vinyl roofs of various types. These are usually seen on Cadillacs and Lincolns, but can be fitted to virtually any car.

== Styles ==
Several vinyl roof designs evolved during the 1960s and 1970s:

- Full - this is the most commonly seen style, in which the vinyl simply covers the whole top of the car, including the C pillars. The windshield pillars may or may not be covered. If "a B" sedan pillar exists, it is usually not covered, but there are many exceptions.

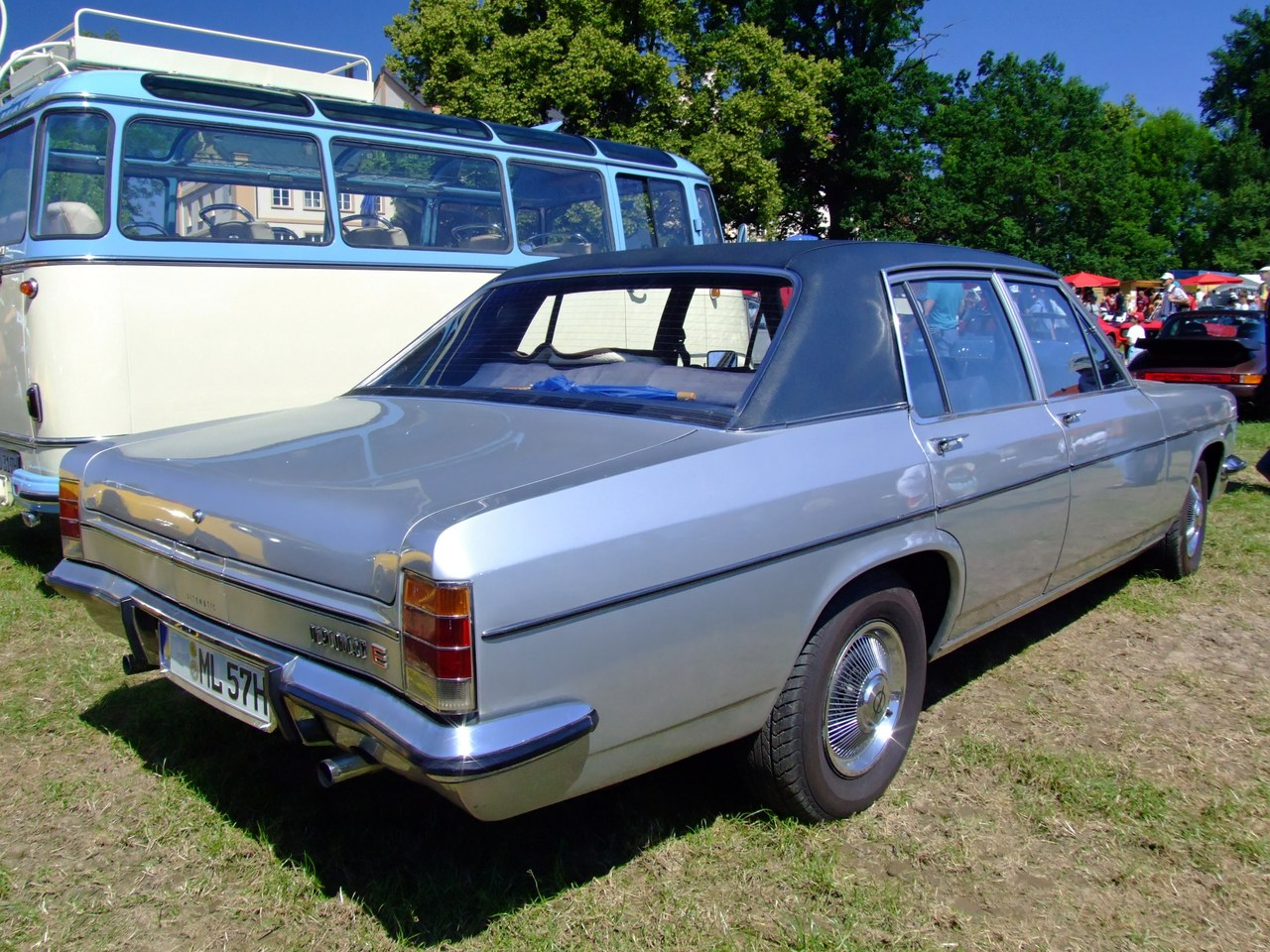
1972 Opel Diplomat B - full design

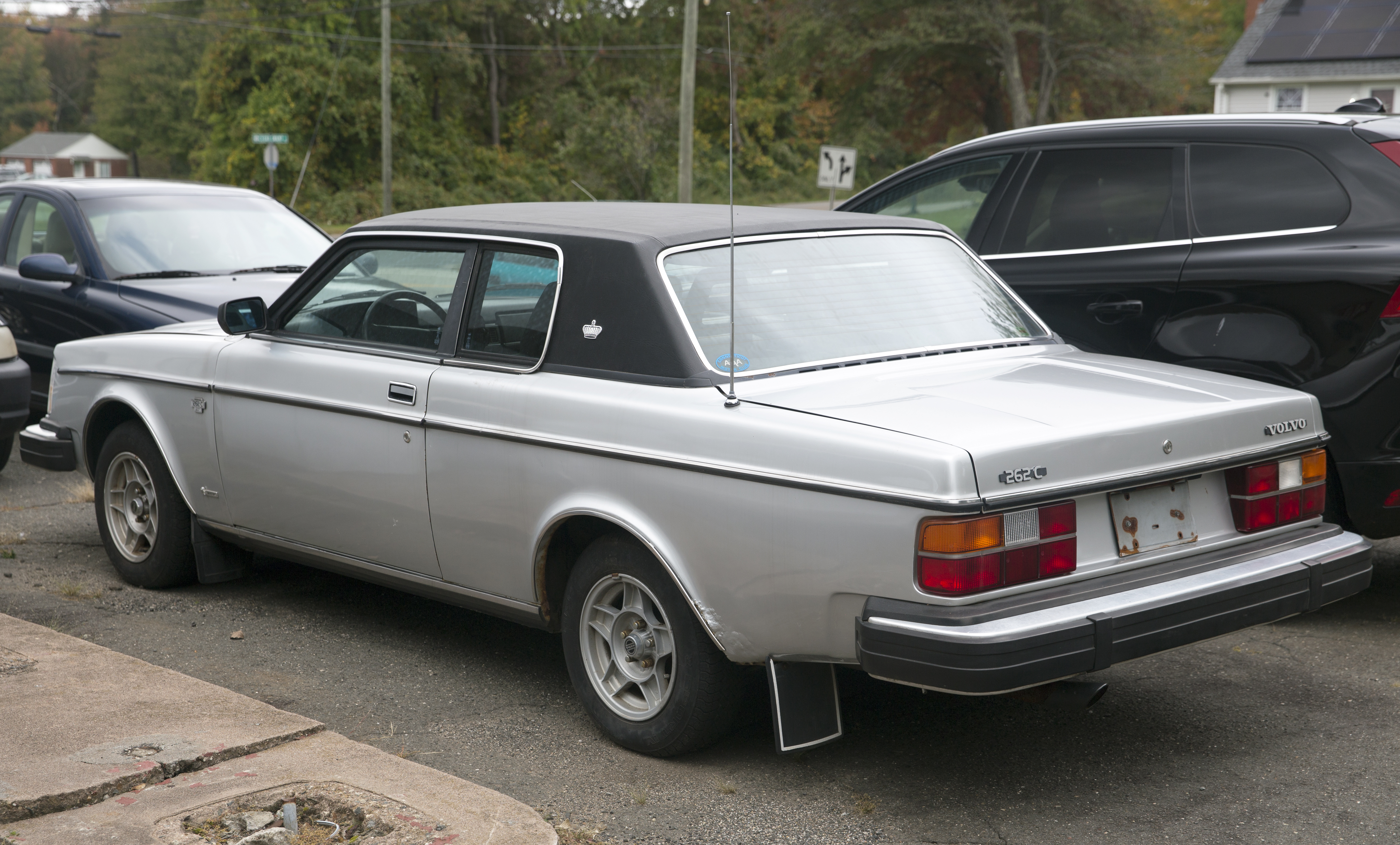
1979 Volvo 262C - full design

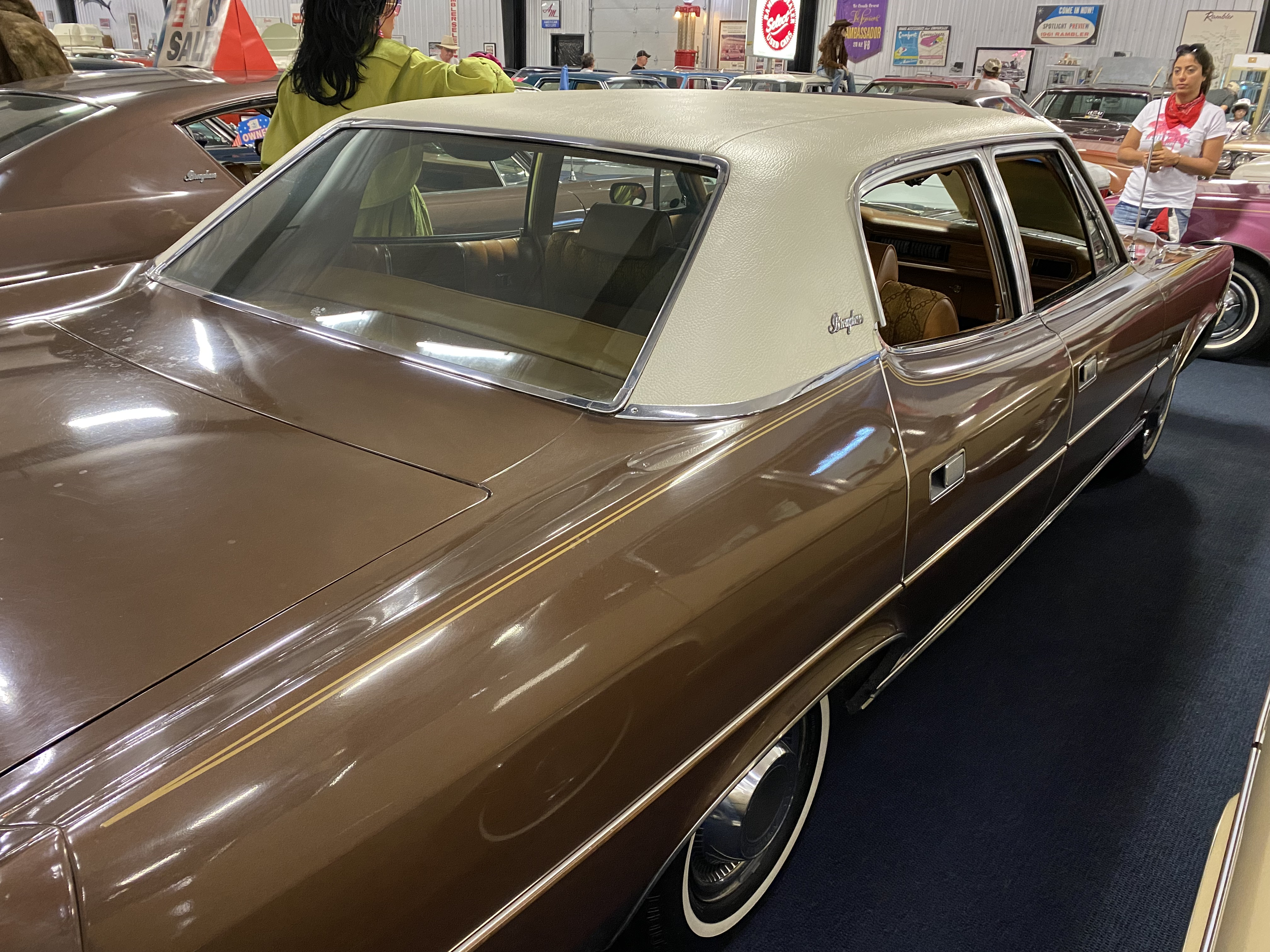
1973 AMC Ambassador - full design

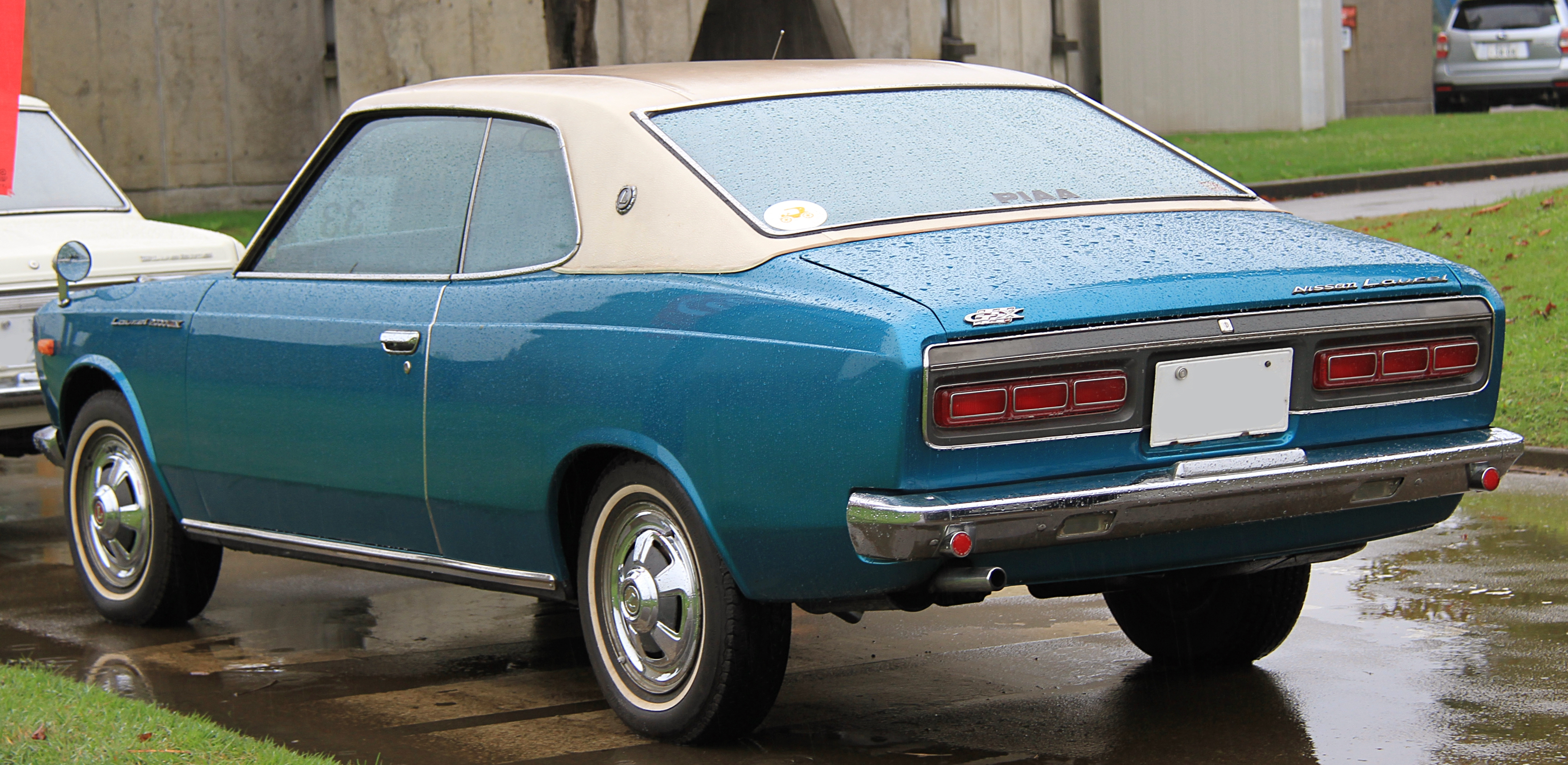
1972 Nissan Laurel 2000GX coupe - full design

- Canopy - in this style, the vinyl covering is applied only to the front half or two-thirds of the roof, usually ending at the trailing edge of the rear side windows. The windshield pillars are very commonly covered in this style, but the C pillars never are.

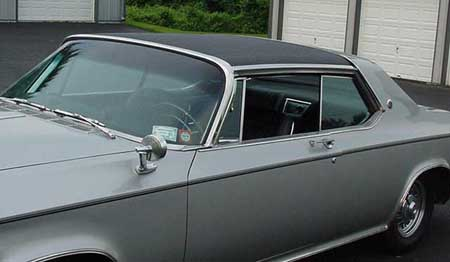
1964 Chrysler 300K - canopy style

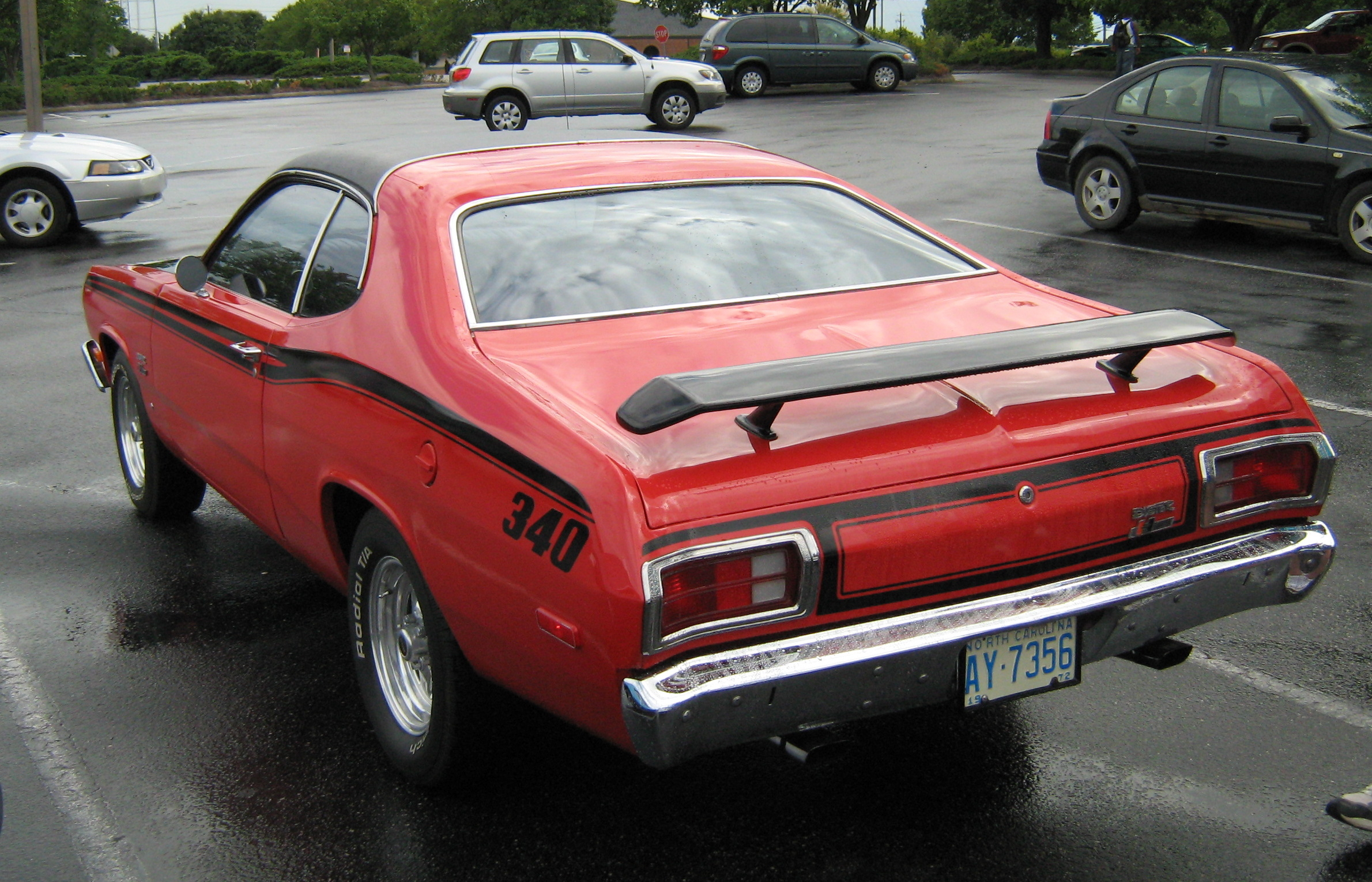
1973 Plymouth Duster - "canopy" style

- Halo - this type is similar to the above, but the vinyl stops just short of the tops of the side windows and windshield, allowing a "halo" of painted sheet metal to appear between the vinyl and the glass area.

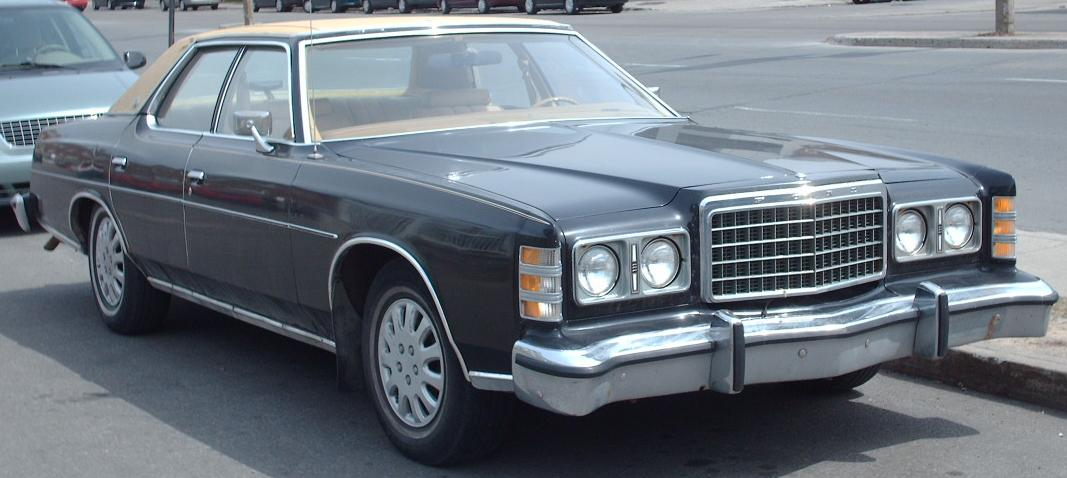
Ford LTD - "halo" design

- Landau - this is almost the opposite of the canopy, as the vinyl covers the rear quarter or third of the roof, including the C pillars, coming as far forward as the trailing edge of either the rear or front side window. In common parlance, this was often called the "half roof," although logically that term could apply to the canopy as well.

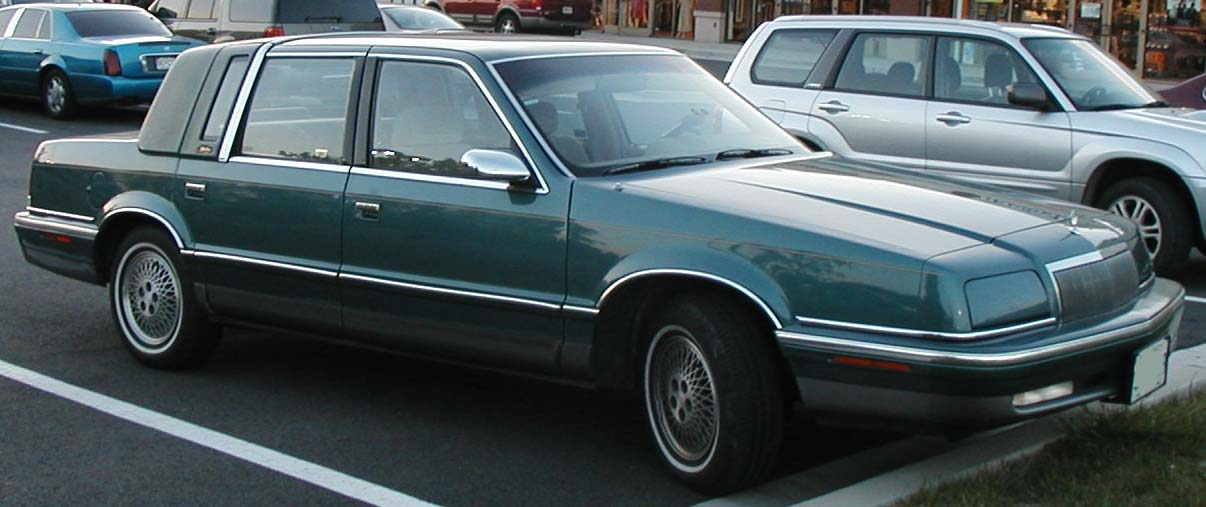
Chrysler New Yorker - landau design

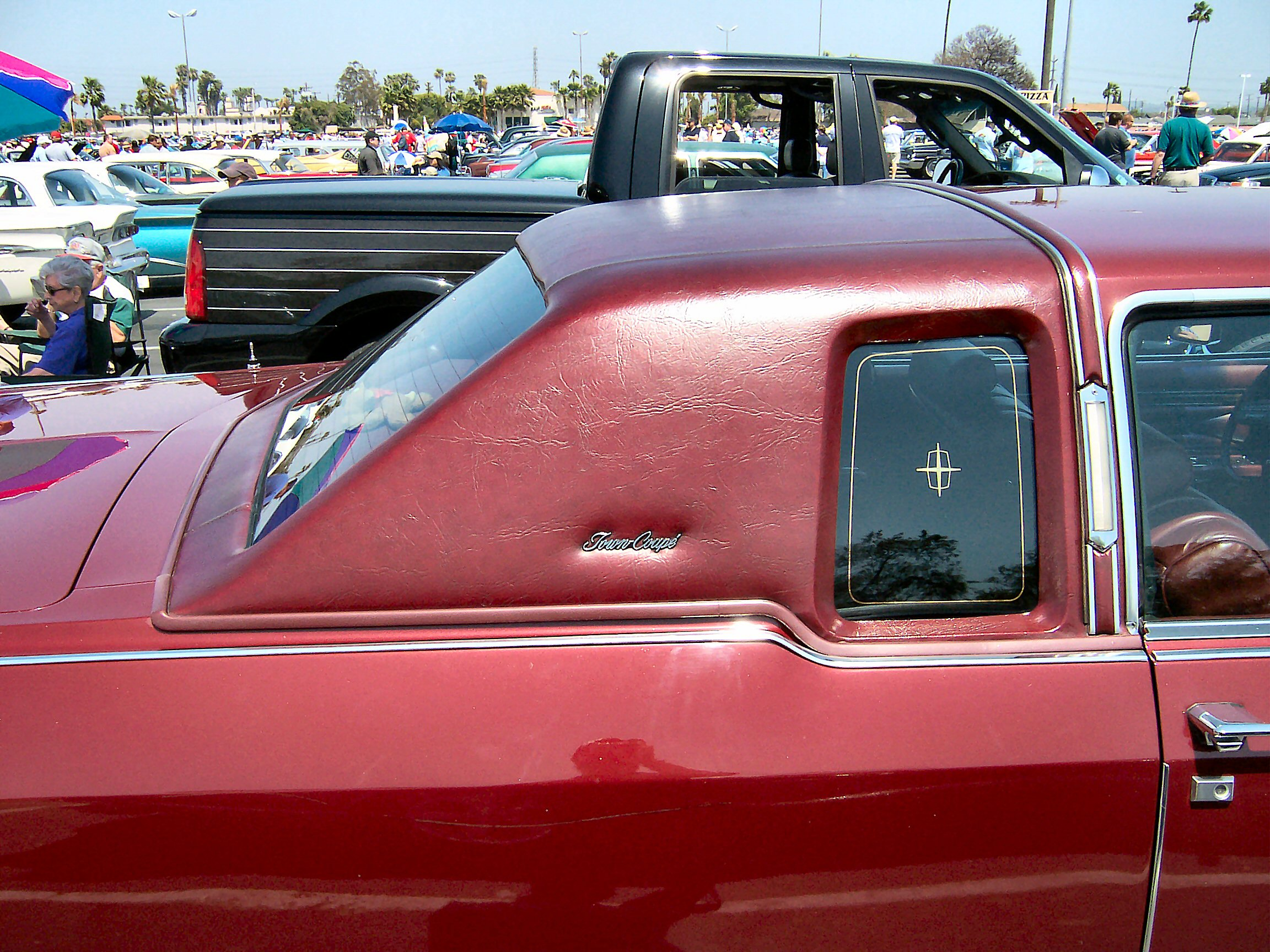
Lincoln Continental Town Coupé - landau design

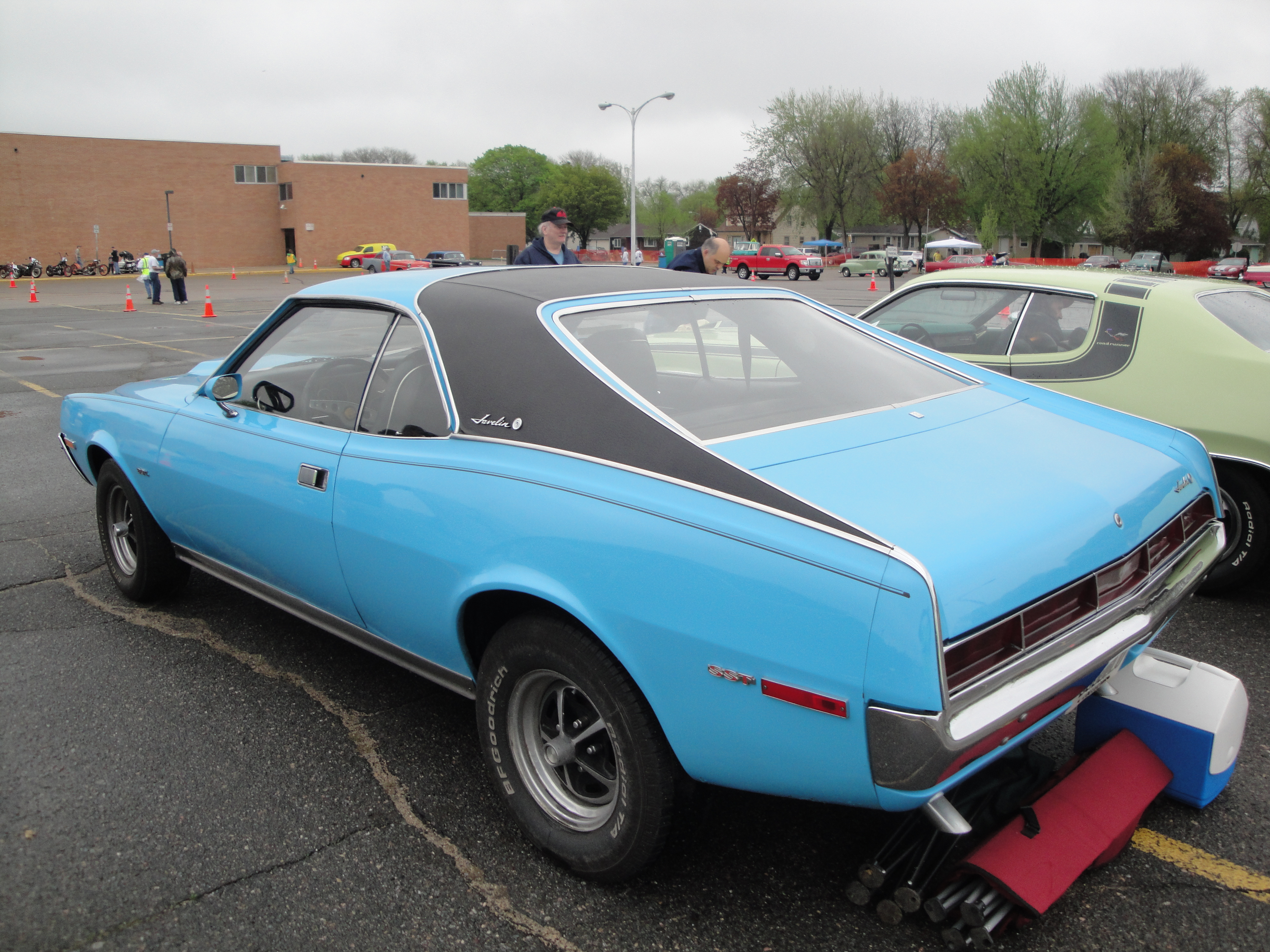
1970 AMC Javelin - combination halo and landau

- Landau and canopy - Both styles on one vehicle. On vinyl-equipped 1977-79 Thunderbirds, two separate vinyl areas existed, one starting at the base of the windshield pillars and extending back to the trailing edge of the front side windows, and another starting at the base of the rear window and coming forward as far as the leading edge of the rear side window. These were separated by a targa band of sheet metal in the middle of the roof, which swept down at the sides to form a thick sedan-like pillar on the sides. It was an updated appearance from the 1955 Ford Crown Victoria "basket handle".

The opera window was mounted in this pillar and was surrounded by sheet metal, not adjacent to either vinyl area. Three windows were mounted on each side of these cars; the Fairmont Futura had a similar style, differing only in not using the center opera window.

A comparable two-piece roof covering was available on the AMC Pacer that emphasized the bump in the roof that accommodated the roll bar over the passenger compartment.

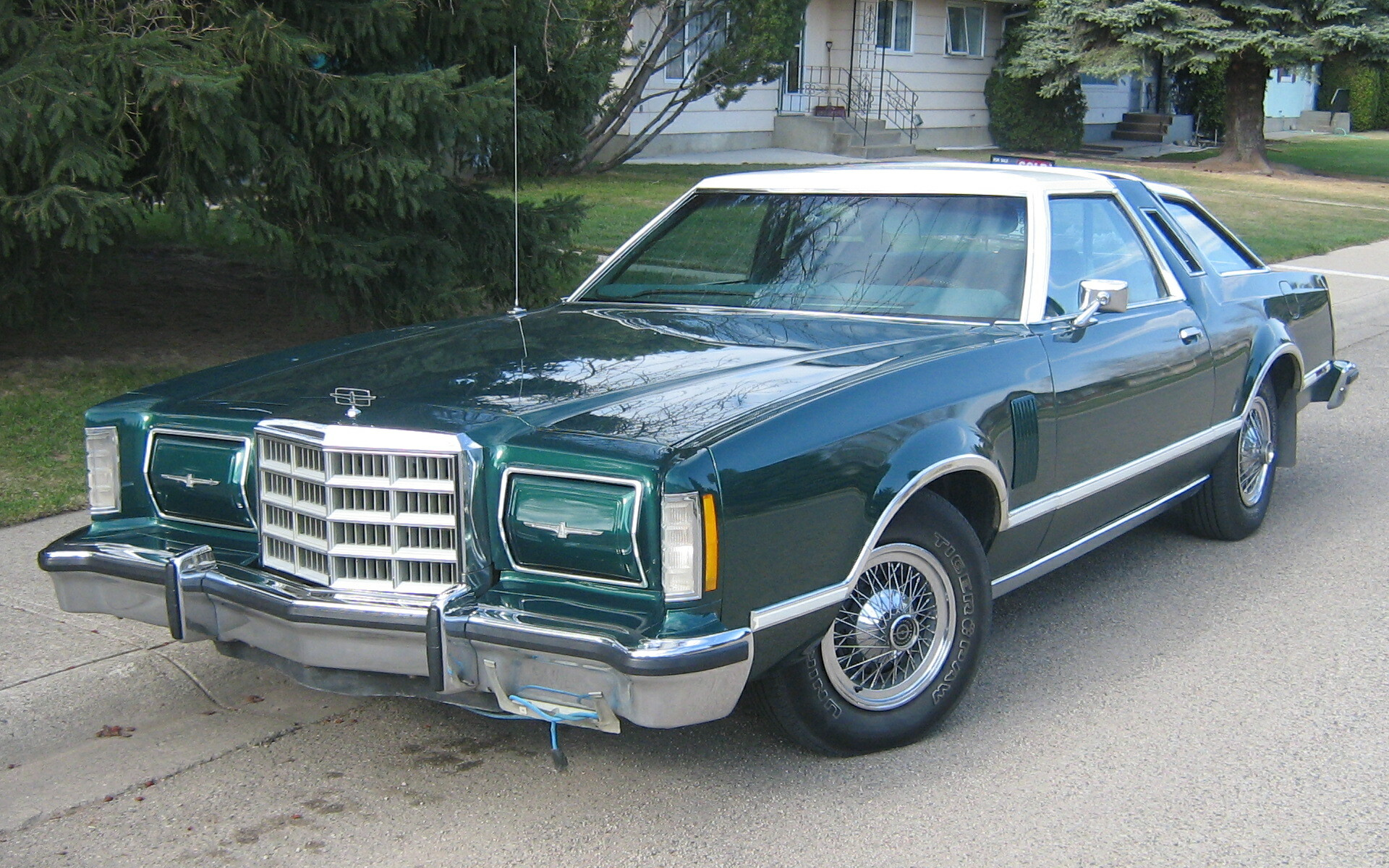
Ford Thunderbird - "landau & canopy" style

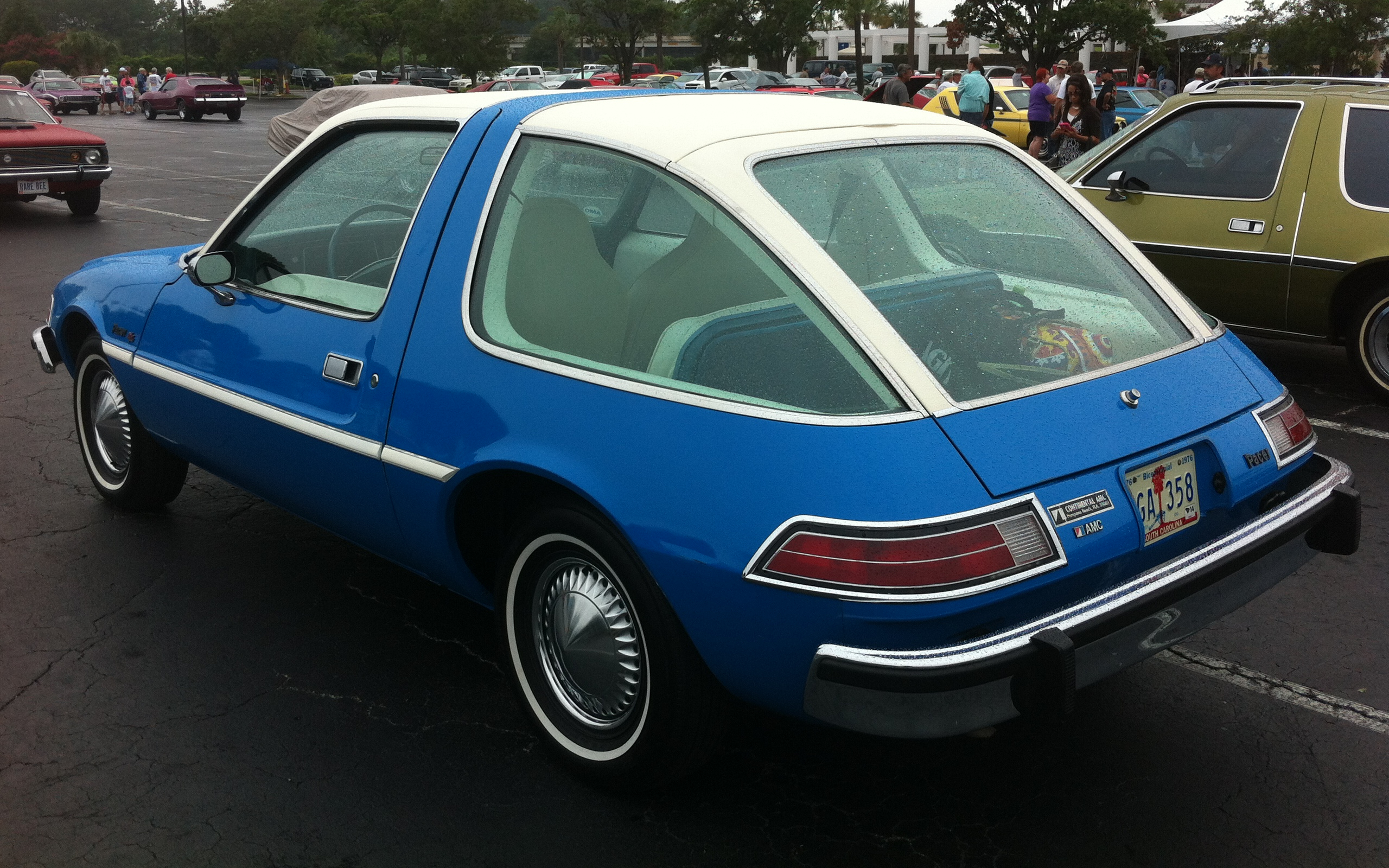
1979 AMC Pacer coupe with two-section roof covering

- Up and over - Chrysler's large and intermediate coupes in the mid to late 1970s were available with a unique design. These cars all had opera windows, and the vinyl extended to only a couple of inches behind the opera window rather than all the way to the rear window as in the case with a full vinyl top treatment. The line of the vinyl then turned upward to run over the top of the car, leaving a margin of sheet metal almost like a roll bar sticking up at the very back of the roof.

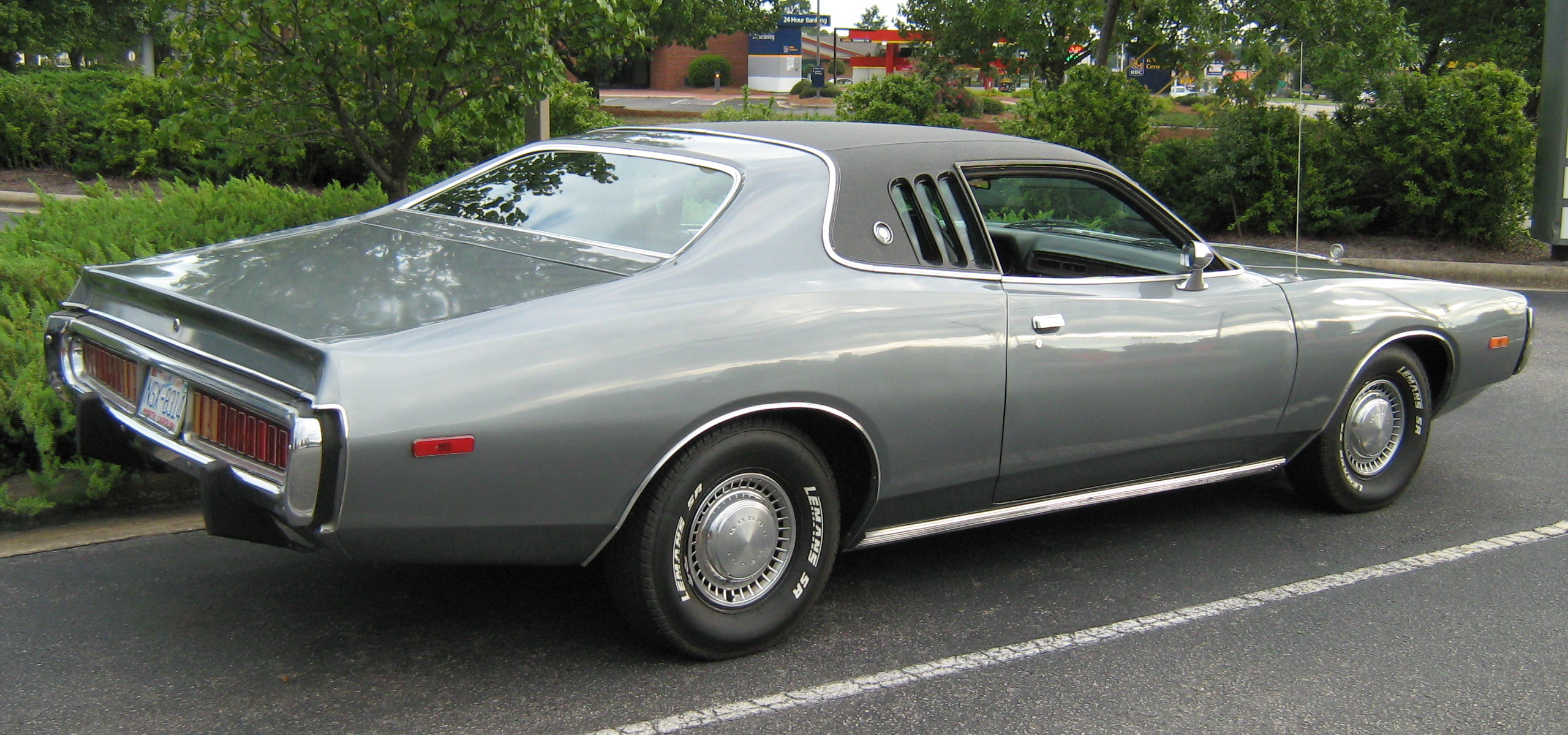
1973 Dodge Charger - "up and over" style

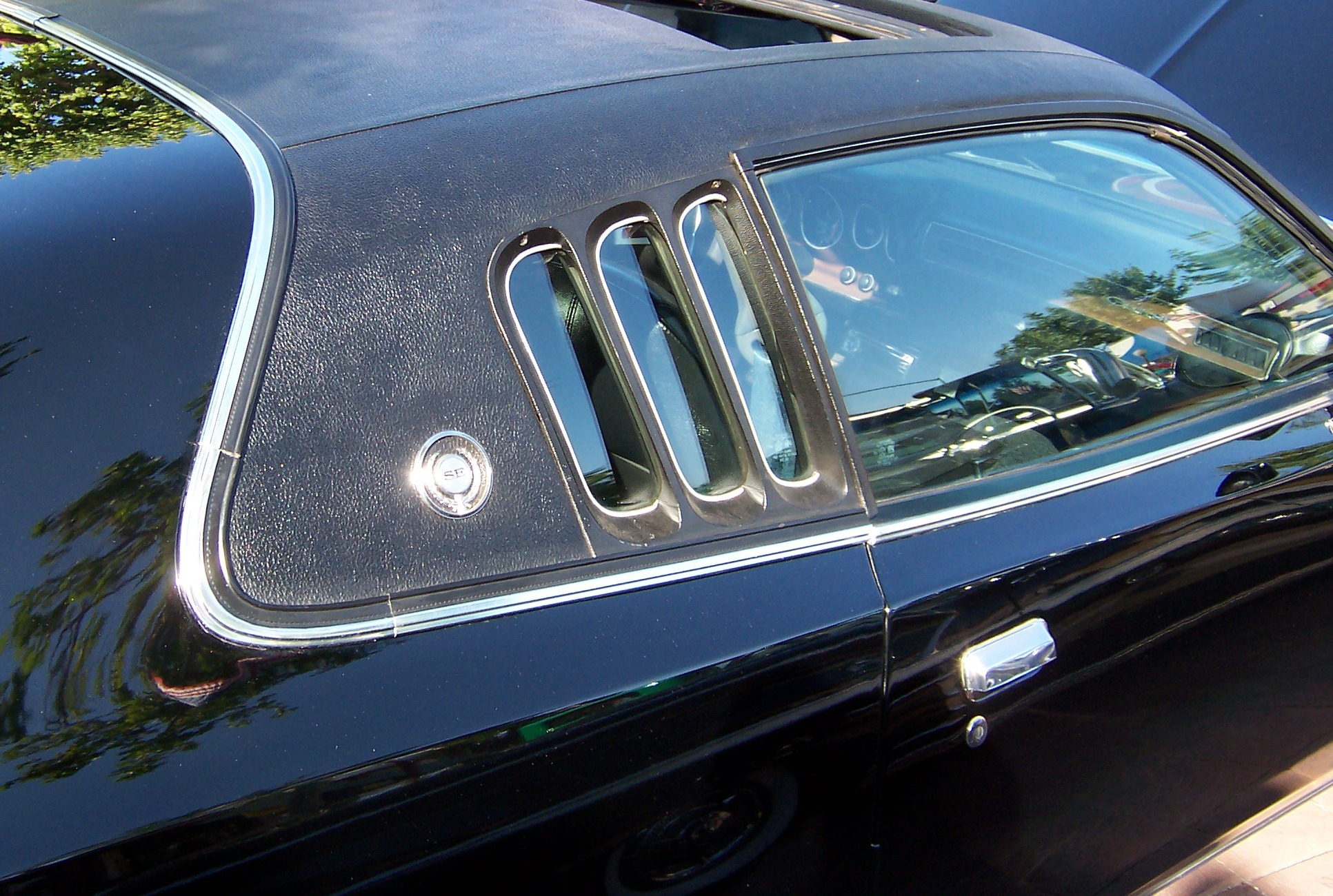
1973 Dodge Charger - "up and over" style
