= Barrett-Jackson =

Auction company

Barrett-Jackson Auction Company LLC.
- Type: Privately held company
- Industry: Auctioneering; Entertainment; Live events Collector cars
- Founded: 1971
- Founders: Tom Barrett & Russ Jackson
- Headquarters: Scottsdale, Arizona, U.S.
- Area served: Worldwide
- Key people: Craig Jackson (chairman and CEO); Steve Davis (president)
- Products: Automobiles; Memorabilia; Merchandise
- Services: Collector car sales Automotive restoration
- Owner: IMG (2022–2025); MARI (2025–present)
- Website: www.barrett-jackson.com

Barrett-Jackson is an American collector car auction company headquartered in Scottsdale, Arizona. It was founded by Scottsdale business partners Tom Barrett and Russ Jackson. They initially launched a car show, Fiesta de los Autos Elegantes, in 1967 to raise money for local facilities. The first Barrett-Jackson auction, originally meant as a one-time event, was held in December 1971. Due to its success, it became an annual event, eventually prompting the creation of other collector car auctions in the Scottsdale area.

Craig Jackson took over full operations in 1995, following the death of his brother and his father. Jackson added vendors and live entertainment to the auction events. Barrett-Jackson saw increased popularity when the Speedvision network, later Speed Channel, began broadcasting the auctions in 1996. It was the first collector car auction to be televised, and coverage has since continued across several channels.

Since 1989, Barrett-Jackson auctions have been held annually at the WestWorld event center in Scottsdale. Additional auction sites were added in the 2000s, including Palm Beach, Florida and Las Vegas, Nevada. The Scottsdale auction is held each January and is considered the flagship event. The auctions are open to the public with an admission fee. Barrett-Jackson auctions typically feature celebrity owned vehicles or those featured in films, and some vehicles are auctioned to benefit various charities. Automotive memorabilia is also auctioned as well.

In August 2022, IMG acquired a majority stake (55%) in Barrett-Jackson.

== History ==
Barrett-Jackson was formed by Tom Barrett and Russ Jackson, who both moved to Scottsdale, Arizona in 1960, after relocating from Illinois and Michigan respectively. Jackson had previously taken his family on regular vacations to a dude ranch near Scottsdale. Upon moving there, he purchased a car wash and eventually added a car restoration shop. Barrett and Jackson met each other through a newspaper ad, as Barrett was attempting to sell a Cadillac V-16. Although the sale never went through, the two became friends and business partners. In 1967, they launched Fiesta de los Autos Elegantes, a car show to raise money for Scottsdale facilities, including an art center and a library.

In mid-1971, Barrett and Jackson traveled to Auburn, Indiana to attend a classic car auction held by auctioneer Robert Kruse and his family. The event inspired the first Barrett-Jackson auto auction, held in Scottsdale in December 1971, with the Kruse family as auctioneers. The event included 50 vehicles from Barrett's collection and 25 from Jackson's, with another 75 from various sellers. The auction was originally meant as a one-time event, but was more successful than expected, garnering 3,000 attendees. It became an annual event, and eventually prompted the creation of other collector car auctions in the Scottsdale area.

Jackson's wife Nellie was a car enthusiast and also took part in the business. Jackson's son, Craig, described his father and Barrett as opposites: "Tom was very colorful and an expert 'showman' and was the wheeler-dealer who went out and found cars around the world and brought them back to Arizona. My mom ran the front office, and my dad ran the shop and restorations. He was more the 'car guy'". Barrett and Jackson jokingly referred to each other as Mr. Loose and Mr. Tight respectively, in reference to their spending habits.

After a lengthy battle with cancer, Russ Jackson died in 1993, at the age of 77. He had retired from the business several years earlier, leaving sons Brian and Craig in charge. Barrett retired following Jackson's death, and he himself would die 11 years later, at the age of 75. Brian Jackson also died from cancer in 1995, leaving his brother in charge. Craig Jackson serves as chairman and CEO of Barrett-Jackson Auction Company. He had worked for the business since he was a child, starting out on trash duty. Upon taking over the company, he disproved skeptics who questioned whether he could handle the business, introducing Internet bidding which further popularized the auctions. He also put out customer surveys, which prompted the expansion of the event to include vendors and live entertainment.

In the 2000s, Barrett-Jackson began expanding to other U.S. cities, while maintaining its headquarters in Scottsdale. Barrett-Jackson garnered $108 million in 2007, a record that would not be broken until 2014, by about $5 million. The auction house had been impacted by the Great Recession, and business did not fully recover until 2018.

In 2021, Barrett-Jackson purchased the Phoenix-based Collector Car Network, which included several classic car publications and the Future Collector Car Show. With the acquisition, Barrett-Jackson aimed to expand the collector car market. In August 2022, it was announced that IMG had acquired a 55% majority stake in Barrett-Jackson in a cash-and-stock deal valued at around $261 million.

== Auction overview ==
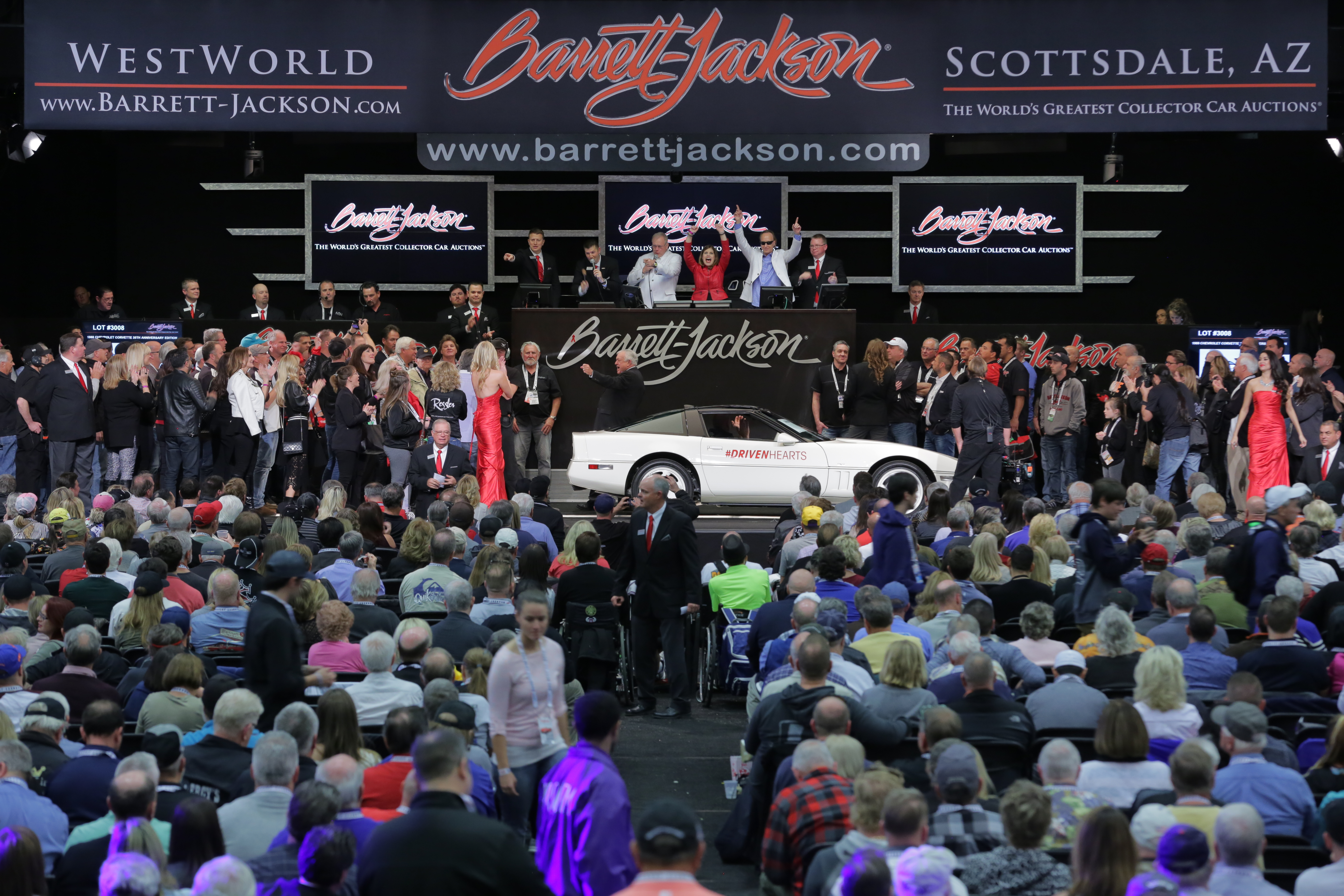
A typical Barrett-Jackson auction

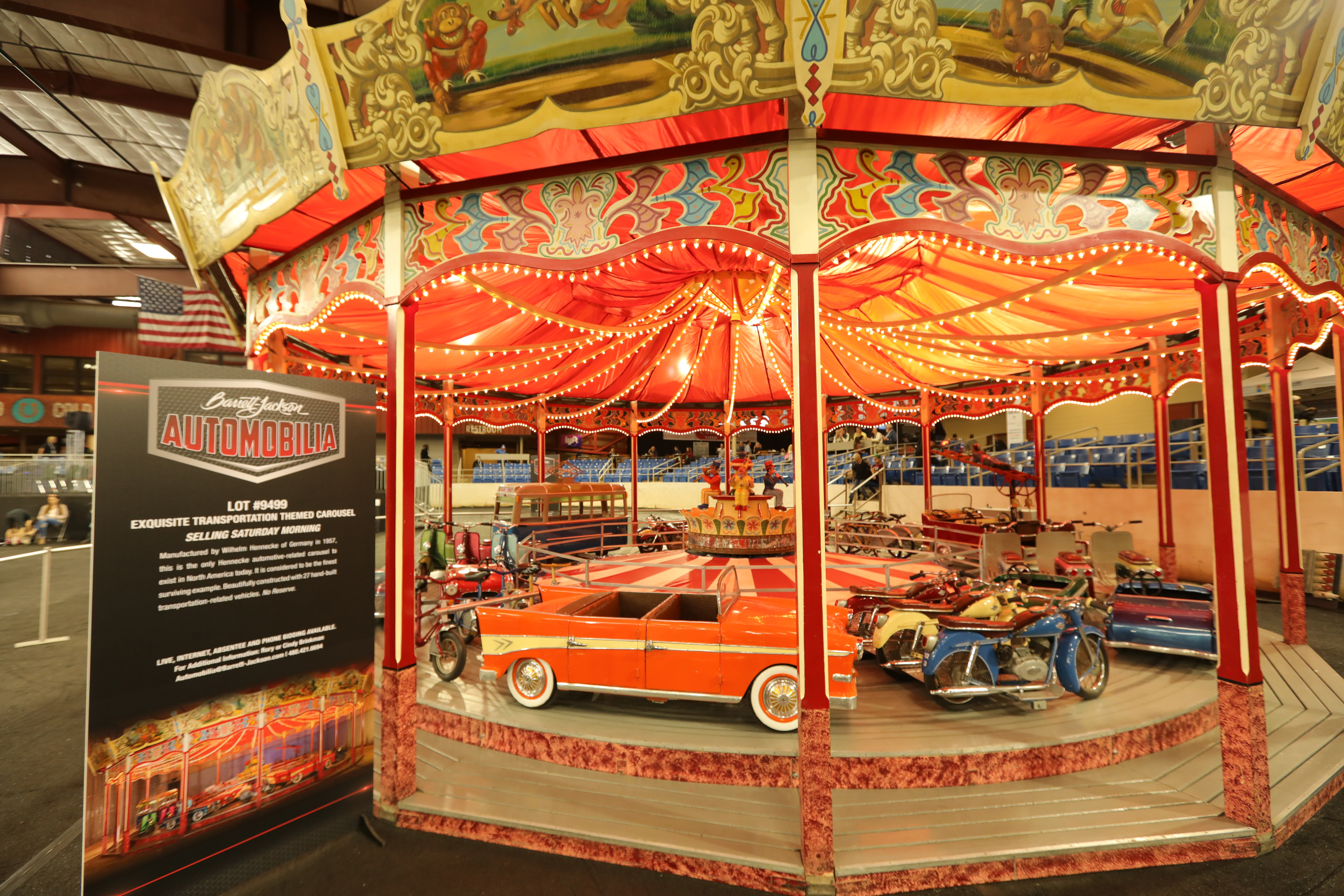
Besides vehicles, Barrett-Jackson also auctions automotive memorabilia, such as this full-size carousel manufactured by Wilhelm Hennecke of Germany in 1957.

Barrett-Jackson is among the largest and best-known automotive events in the world. Peter W. Frey, writing for The New York Times in 1990, described Barrett-Jackson as "the Superbowl for collectible cars", stating that it attracts "the best vehicles" and "biggest buyers". The auctions are popular among celebrities, some of whom have also put their own vehicles up for sale. Notable attendees and sellers have included Jerry Seinfeld, Reggie Jackson, Tim Allen, Don Johnson, Jay Leno, Nicolas Cage, Phillip Maloof, Criss Angel, William Shatner, and Larry Fitzgerald.

Auctions run for several days and are open to the public with an admission fee. As of 2002, the Scottsdale event attracted up to 150,000 people annually, many of them from California. Bidders make up only a small percentage of attendees. In 2015, for instance, the event attracted 350,000 people but only 5,000 of them were bidders, making up less than two percent of attendees. The auctioneer team is aided by ringmen who are present in the audience and yell to draw attention to interested buyers.

Vehicles are typically offered without a minimum bid, otherwise known as a reserve. In 2005, all vehicles were offered for the first time without a reserve. For a fee, sellers can opt to have a detailing crew touch up their vehicles.

Early on, the auctions showcased many pre-World War II vehicles, but with generational changes, the focus gradually shifted to muscle cars. During the mid-2000s, Barrett-Jackson specialized in American vehicles – especially muscle cars – from the 1950s through 1970s. By 2017, the Millennials demographic had become more prevalent at Barrett-Jackson auctions, with a particular interest in Japanese vehicles and vintage SUVs.

Barrett-Jackson prefers vehicles that are associated with a unique story, such as celebrity ownership or use on a racetrack. Barrett-Jackson has a verification team to authenticate such stories. In 2020, a Rolls-Royce Phantom V that purportedly belonged to deceased evangelist Billy Graham was pulled from the auction lineup, after the authenticity of its ownership was questioned. Nine years earlier, Barrett-Jackson had auctioned a 1963 Pontiac Bonneville ambulance that purportedly was used to transport the body of U.S. president John F. Kennedy following his assassination. Questions about the vehicle's history were raised shortly before the auction, and Barrett-Jackson acknowledged that its provenance could not be definitely proven, stating "there are credible reports that indicate there were two 1963 Pontiac Bonneville ambulances involved" with one "actually carrying President Kennedy's casket and family members and the other acting as a diversion".

Automotive memorabilia, such as gas pumps and neon signage, is auctioned in addition to vehicles, and is also offered for sale by vendors.

== Locations ==
Although Barrett-Jackson auctions are held in several U.S. cities, its flagship event takes place each January in Scottsdale. The first auction was held in 1971, on a dirt lot at the Safari Hotel in Scottsdale. In 1977, the event moved out of town to Phoenix Municipal Stadium. Scottsdale mayor Herb Drinkwater later convinced Barrett-Jackson to return by having the city construct an events arena known as WestWorld, where the auctions have continued to run annually since 1989.

By 2001, Barrett-Jackson also hosted auctions for vintage race cars every other year in Monaco, coinciding with the Historic Grand Prix. That year, a second U.S. auction site was added at the Petersen Automotive Museum in Los Angeles, which ran until 2004.

In 2003, Barrett-Jackson opened another annual auction site in Palm Beach, Florida, where it continues as of 2023. It is held annually at the South Florida Fairgrounds, typically in late March or early April.

A Las Vegas auction was added in 2008, held annually at the Mandalay Bay resort. The event was typically held in late September or early October. In 2021, the event switched to a June date and moved to the newly completed West Hall at the Las Vegas Convention Center.

From 2010 through 2012, Barrett-Jackson hosted annual auctions at the OC Fair & Event Center in Costa Mesa, California. The event's first year was held partially in a large venue known as the Hangar, recently completed by the event center. The remainder of the 2010 auction was held in a large tent connected to the Hangar. Finding these facilities too small, Barrett-Jackson held the next two annual auctions entirely in a larger tent, transported from Scottsdale and set up on the fairgrounds' parking lot. The 2012 auction saw nearly 54,000 attendees and brought in $14 million, an improvement over previous years. Nevertheless, Barrett-Jackson announced that it would not return to Costa Mesa for a fourth auction, stating that profits were lower than expected. The business cited the high costs associated with using the tent, including transportation, setting up, and maintenance. Scheduling conflicts also factored into Barrett-Jackson's decision not to return.

Having outgrown the California site, Barrett-Jackson added a new auction site in Reno, Nevada in 2013, in partnership with Hot August Nights. While the Las Vegas event focuses on exotic vehicles, the Reno auction would focus more on hot rods and muscle cars. Barrett-Jackson held its final Reno auction in 2015, announcing that it would not return the following year. Despite record sales in 2015, Reno was still Barrett-Jackson's least profitable auction site.

Barrett-Jackson expanded to the northeastern U.S. for the first time in 2016, with an annual auction held each June at the Mohegan Sun resort in Uncasville, Connecticut. Amid the COVID-19 pandemic in the United States, Barrett-Jackson canceled its Connecticut auction before the fifth annual event got underway.

A Texas auction site was added in 2021, at the NRG Center in Houston. A New Orleans event is scheduled to debut in September 2023.

== Notable sales ==
Barrett-Jackson typically features vehicles once owned by celebrities, such as Howard Hughes, Debbie Reynolds, Lucille Ball, Paul Walker, and Simon Cowell.

It also features vehicles used in film series, such as Fast & Furious and Transformers. Film-based replica vehicles are also auctioned, including a recreation of the Ecto-1 from Ghostbusters and a 1993 Ford Explorer tour vehicle from Jurassic Park. In addition, Barrett-Jackson has also auctioned vehicles used in television shows, such as The Sopranos.

Vehicle	Sale price	Auction details	Notes
1938 Mercedes-Benz 540K roadster	$240,000	Phoenix, 1982	Originally a gift from Adolf Hitler to his longtime companion, Eva Braun. Tom Barrett spent $100,000 to restore the vehicle, and donated $15,000 of the profit to the Simon Wiesenthal Foundation, a Holocaust research organization.
1940 Mercedes-Benz 770 limousine	$153,000	Scottsdale, 1973	Parade vehicle used by Hitler, and the most profitable vehicle ever auctioned at the time.
1950 GM Futurliner #11	$4.1 million $4 million	Scottsdale, 2006 Scottsdale, 2015	One of 12 Futurliners ever created, and the most profitable vehicle auctioned at Barrett-Jackson as of 2006. Proceeds from the 2015 sale were donated to the Armed Forces Foundation.
1954 Oldsmobile F-88	$3.2 million	Scottsdale, 2005	A one-of-a-kind concept car, and the most profitable vehicle auctioned at Barrett-Jackson up to that point.
Batmobile	$4.6 million	Scottsdale, 2013	Originally created in 1955 as the Lincoln Futura, a one-of-a-kind concept car. It was later modified by George Barris to become the Batmobile, for use in the 1960s television series Batman. The 2013 auction marked the first time that the vehicle had been put up for sale.
1956 Bentley S1	$50,000	Phoenix, 1981	Used by singer John Lennon from 1966 to 1968, and sold a month after Lennon's murder. Auction profits were donated to his Spirit Foundation.
1961 Ol' Yaller	$198,000	Las Vegas, 2009	Created by Max Balchowsky and driven by Elvis Presley in the 1964 film Viva Las Vegas.
1966 Shelby Cobra 427 Super Snake	$5.5 million	Scottsdale, 2007	One-of-a-kind vehicle that was once used by Carroll Shelby as his personal car. It is the most profitable vehicle ever auctioned at Barrett-Jackson, and sold again for the same price in 2021.
1967 Volkswagen Samba (21-window)	$120,000	Palm Beach, 2018	Featured on the 1990s television series That '70s Show.
1968 Ford Econoline	$59,400	Scottsdale, 2019	Customized to resemble the Mystery Machine van from the Scooby-Doo franchise.
General Lee	$450,000 $110,000	Scottsdale, 2008 Scottsdale, 2012	A 1969 Dodge Charger modified to portray the General Lee on the television series The Dukes of Hazzard. Sold in 2012 to golfer Bubba Watson.
1976 AMC Pacer	$37,400 $71,500	Las Vegas, 2016 Scottsdale, 2022	Used in the 1992 film Wayne's World.

== Broadcasting ==
In 1996, Craig Jackson made an agreement to broadcast the auction on the new Speedvision network, later known as Speed Channel. It became the first collector car auction to be televised. The initial coverage consisted of taped highlights aired after the auction concluded. The following year, due to its popularity on the network, Barrett-Jackson was broadcast live for the first time with six hours of coverage. Jackson said, "When I first brought the auction to television in 1996, I wanted to bring the collector-car industry in front of a wider audience. Prior to that it was covered only by niche publications". In 2001, Speedvision was purchased by Fox Entertainment Group, which renamed it Speed Channel a year later. The network continued to broadcast auction coverage for the next decade. In 2004, Barrett-Jackson also partnered with Speed to produce a short-lived reality television series, Car Search, in which teams acquire and auction vehicles to benefit college charities.

Speed ended operations in 2013, and was replaced by Fox Sports 1 (FS1). Auction coverage was then spread across several Fox-owned channels, including but not limited to FS1, Fox Sports 2, Fox Business Network, and National Geographic Channel. The 2013 Scottsdale auction was also broadcast on the over-the-air Fox network.

In 2015, broadcast rights to the events were acquired from Fox by Discovery Channel and Velocity (later Motor Trend), beginning with the Scottsdale auction that year. Chris Jacobs of Overhaulin' and Ray Evernham of Velocity's AmeriCARna became the main on-air hosts, joined by Rick DeBruhl, Mike Joy, and Steve Magnante as analysts.

In January 2020, Barrett-Jackson announced a new broadcasting agreement with A&E Networks, which would see coverage and related programming carried by History and FYI.

== Charity work ==
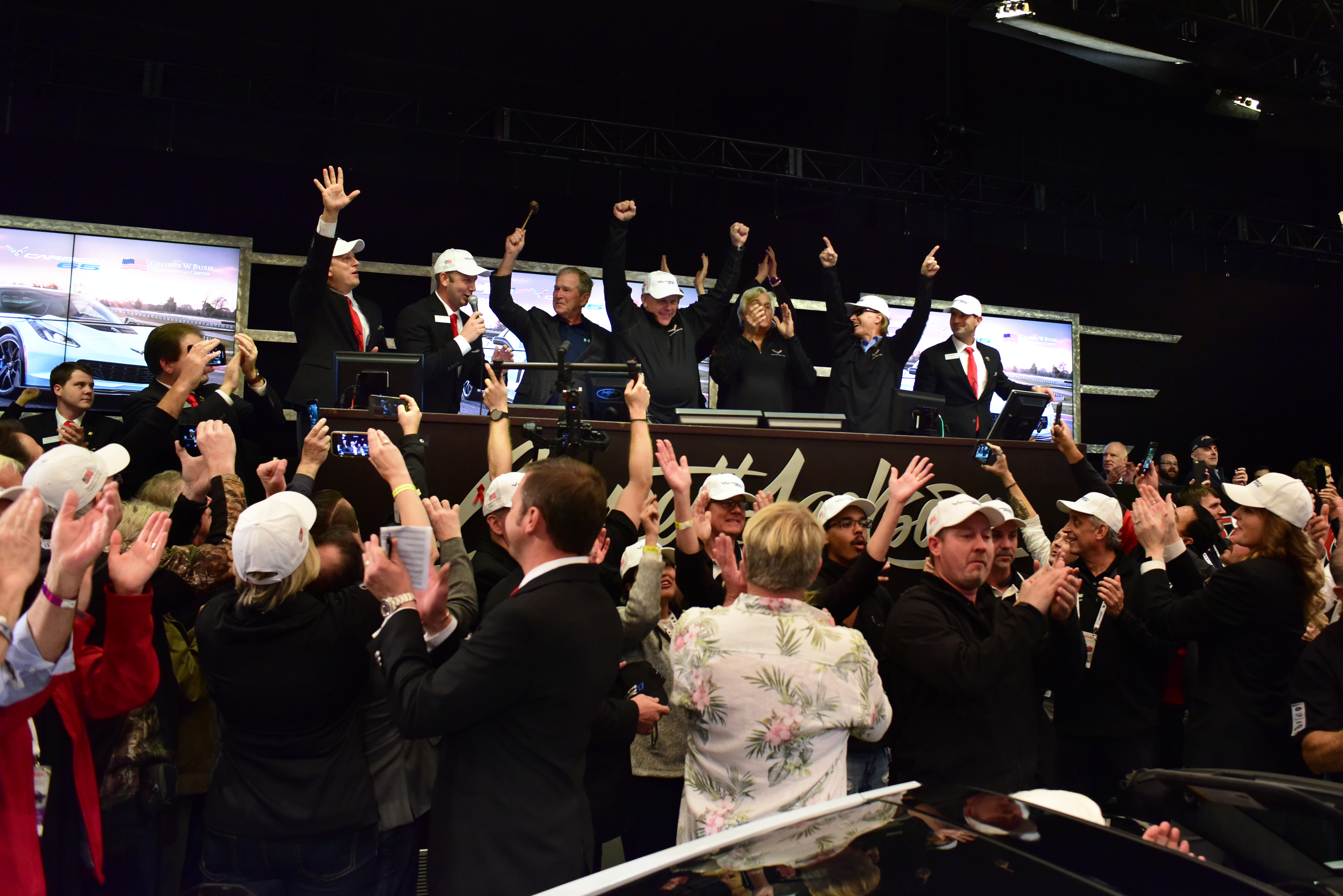
Former president Bush on the auction block

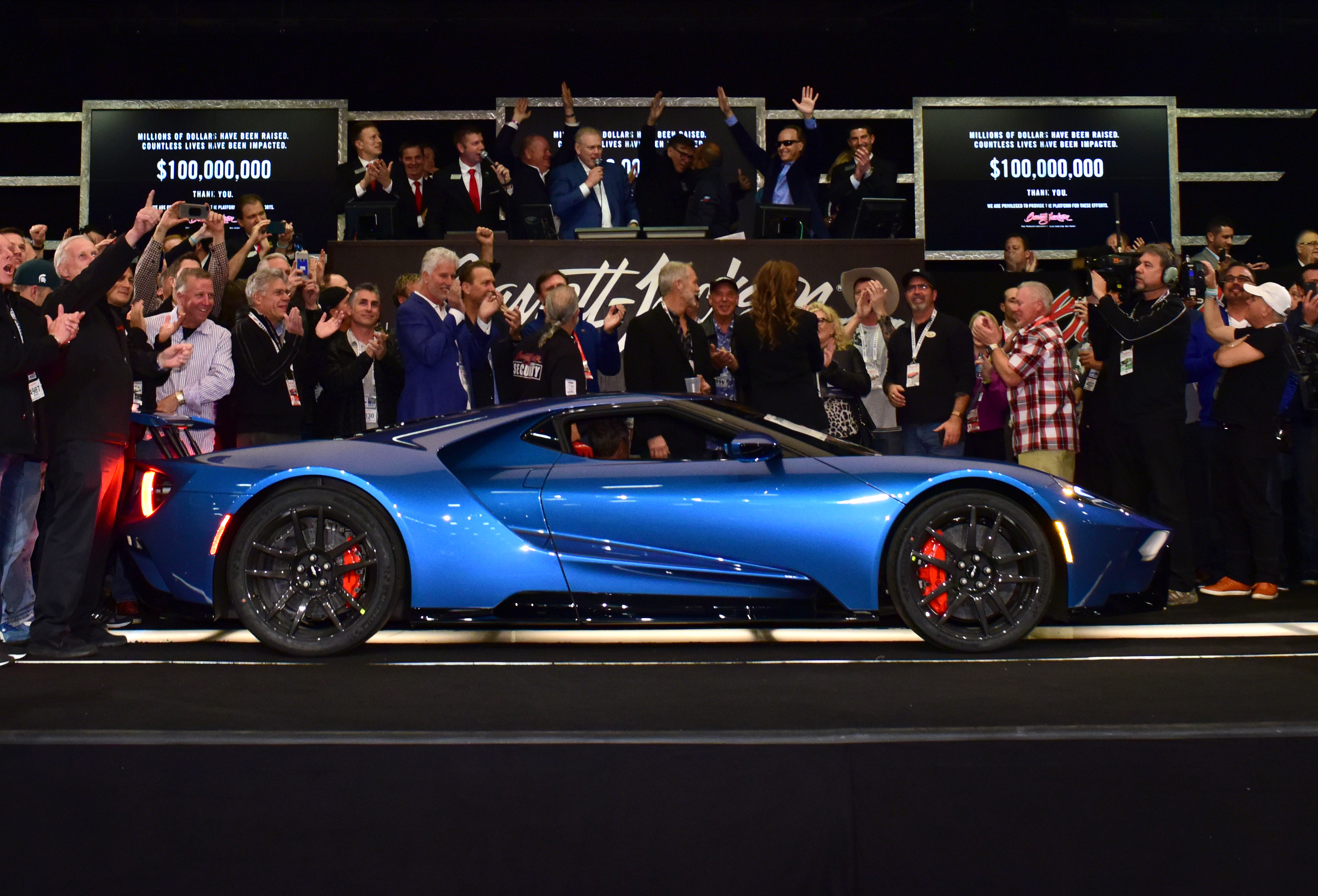
A 2017 Ford GT helped Barrett-Jackson reach its $100 million milestone

Barrett-Jackson is known for its charitable donations, raising money from the auctioning of select vehicles. Auto companies often consign their first production model to Barrett-Jackson to aid in raising money for charity. Celebrities have also consigned their vehicles for charity, including singer Steven Tyler, racecar driver Dale Earnhardt Jr., actor Gary Sinise, and drummer Travis Barker.

In 2010, Craig Jackson formed the Barrett-Jackson Cancer Research Fund at TGen, in memory of his father and brother. Barrett-Jackson auctions have raised money to benefit other organizations as well, including JDRF, the American Heart Association (AHA), and the Bob Woodruff Foundation.

During the 2018 Scottsdale auction, Barrett-Jackson surpassed the $100 million mark for charity donations raised throughout its 47-year history. The 2018 event was attended by George W. Bush, marking the first time that a former U.S. president had visited Barrett-Jackson. Bush was present on the auction block for the sale of a 2018 Chevrolet Corvette, with the proceeds benefitting the George W. Bush Presidential Center's military service initiative.

Also in 2018, Barrett-Jackson launched its Driven Hearts initiative to benefit AHA. In conjunction with this, the Arizona Department of Transportation introduced a Barrett-Jackson theme license plate, with revenue going to AHA.

== Co-branding and licensing ==
In 2001, Barrett-Jackson partnered with Mattel to release a series of Matchbox toys modeled after auctioned vehicles. In 2008, Sherwin-Williams and Barrett-Jackson launched a line of auto paint under the Planet Color brand. The line of 25 colors was sold in NAPA and Sherwin-Williams stores.

Barrett-Jackson Endorsed Collector Car Insurance was introduced in 2009 and includes several insurance providers who meet each client's unique needs, with AIG Private Client Group serving as the primary carrier. It includes policies for homes, daily drivers, fine art and more. The company is licensed in all 50 states and also has international capability.

Since 2011, Woodside Credit has been a fixture at Barrett-Jackson auctions as the exclusive automotive loan provider. During the auction, each big screen flanking the auction block has an "Estimated Monthly Payment" in the lower right-hand corner. The estimated payment updates in real-time and helps bidders understand the affordable monthly cost of a vehicle during the lively and fast-moving auctions.

== Arizona VIN change ==
In early 2022, Arizona governor Doug Ducey signed a law into effect allowing for the temporary removal of older vehicle identification numbers (VINs), making repairs and restoration easier. Barrett-Jackson advocated the change, which applies to vehicles manufactured prior to 1981, when 17-digit VINs were standardized. Craig Jackson noted that the placement of VINs on older vehicles tends to be random, thus interfering with restoration work.

== 2007 disputes ==
The 2007 Scottsdale auction featured the last authenticated race car created by the Ramchargers, a former drag racing team that had been staffed by Chrysler employees. After the car sold for $300,000, owner David Clabuesch accused Barrett-Jackson of ending the auctioneering prematurely, resulting in a lower-than-expected sale price. After the sale, Barrett-Jackson sued Clabuesch for "outrageous and defamatory actions," including chaining the car's wheels at the auction tent and putting up a sign calling its sale "void". In 2008, Barrett-Jackson announced a settlement in which Clabuesch exonerated the company of all allegations.

During the same auction, Keith Martin, editor of Sports Car Market and a member of Speed Channel's on-air commentary team for the auction, was ejected by Barrett-Jackson. At the time, Sports Car Market had run unfavorable editorials about the state of the collector car industry and whether some cars were worth the high dollars being spent on them, though the magazine did not mention Barrett-Jackson or any other firm by name. During the auction, Martin allegedly made comments about company business practices and the quality of cars sold; according to Barrett-Jackson, he told people in the media center to leave and attend the auction of a competitor. He was dropped as a Speed commentator, at the request of Barrett-Jackson.

== See also ==
- Auction theory
- Auto auction
- Antique car
- Classic car
- Game theory
- Online auction business model
- Winner's curse
