= List of gridiron football teams in Canada =

This is a list of gridiron football teams in Canada.

== Professional teams ==
=== Active leagues ===
==== Canadian football ====
===== Canadian Football League =====
====== Active teams ======
Team	City	Established	Grey Cups	Notes
BC Lions	Vancouver, British Columbia	1954	6	
Calgary Stampeders	Calgary, Alberta	1935	8	Renamed from Bronks to Stampeders in 1944.
Edmonton Elks	Edmonton, Alberta	1949	14	Renamed from Eskimos to Elks in 2021
Hamilton Tiger-Cats	Hamilton, Ontario	1950	8	The Hamilton Wildcats and Hamilton Tigers merged in 1950 to form the Tiger-Cats
Montreal Alouettes	Montreal, Quebec	1946	8	The Baltimore Stallions moved to Montreal after the 1995 season and were renamed the Montreal Alouettes. The new club, the third iteration of the Alouettes, assumed the history of all past professional clubs in Montreal.
Ottawa Redblacks	Ottawa, Ontario	2014	1	The Redblacks are the third CFL Team in Ottawa after the Ottawa Rough Riders and the Ottawa Renegades. The Rough Riders won 9 Grey Cups.
Saskatchewan Roughriders	Regina, Saskatchewan	1910	5	Renamed from Regina Rugby Club to Regina Roughriders in 1923 and from Regina to Saskatchewan in 1947.
Toronto Argonauts	Toronto, Ontario	1873	19	The oldest pro sports team in North America to continually use the same name and be located in the same city.
Winnipeg Blue Bombers	Winnipeg, Manitoba	1930	12	The Winnipeg Winnipegs and the Winnipeg St. Johns merged to become the Winnipeg 'Pegs in 1933. Renamed from 'Pegs to Blue Bombers in 1936.

====== Defunct teams ======
Team	City	Existed	Grey Cups	Notes
Atlantic Schooners	Halifax, Nova Scotia	1984	0	Never played a game.
Ottawa Renegades	Ottawa, Ontario	2002-05	0	Suspended operations after 2005 season.
Ottawa Rough Riders	Ottawa, Ontario	1876-1996	9	Folded after 1996 season.

==== Indoor football/arena football ====
===== Arena Football League =====
====== Defunct team ======
Team	City	Existence	Arena Bowls	Notes
Toronto Phantoms	Toronto, Ontario	2001-02	0	Folded after 2002 season.

Can- Am Indoor Football League

Defunct Teams

Team	City	Existence	Championships	Notes
Niagara Spartans	Niagara, Ontario	2017-18	0	Folded during the 2017-18 season.

=== Defunct leagues ===
==== American football ====
===== American Football Conference =====
Team	City	Existence	Championships	Notes
Sarnia Golden Bears	Sarnia, Ontario	1961	1	League dissolved before the 1962 season.

===== Continental Football League =====
Team	City	Existence	Championships	Notes
Montreal Beavers	Montreal, Quebec	1966-67	0	
Toronto Rifles	Toronto, Ontario	1965-67	0	

===== United Football League =====
Team	City	Existence	Championships	Notes
Quebec Rifles	Montreal, Quebec	1964	0	

===== World Football League =====
Team	City	Existence	Championships	Notes
Toronto Northmen	Toronto, Ontario	1974	0	Never played a game because of the Canadian Football Act. Moved to Memphis in 1974.

===== World League of American Football =====
Team	City	Existence	World Bowls	Notes
Montreal Machine	Montreal, Quebec	1991-92	0	WLAF suspended operations after 1992 season. When it returned in 1995, all North American teams had been folded.

== Semi-professional/senior ==
=== American football ===
==== Empire Football League ====
===== Active teams =====
Team	City	Established	EFL Championships	Notes
Ottawa Demon Deacons	Ottawa, Ontario			
Quebec Titans	Châteauguay, Quebec		2008	Renamed from Chateauguay Titans to Quebec Titans in 2008.

===== Defunct teams =====
Team	City	Existence	EFL Championships	Notes
Montreal Condors	Montreal, Quebec	1990-		Renamed from Voyageurs to Condors in 1994.
Ottawa Bootleggers	Ottawa, Ontario	1988; 1991–92	0	Left the Empire Football League after 1988 season and rejoined the league in 1991. The Bootleggers folded after the 1992 season.

==== Mid Continental Football League ====
===== Defunct teams =====
Team	City	Existence	MCFL Championships	Notes
Toronto Athletics	Toronto, Ontario		1	

==== North American Football League ====
===== Active teams =====
Team	City	Established	NAFL Championships	Notes
British Columbia Spartans	Langley, British Columbia	2008	0	
London Silverbacks	London, Ontario	2007	0	
Tri-City Titans	Kitchener, Ontario	2007	0	

===== Defunct teams =====
Team	City	Existed	NAFL Championships	Notes
Hamilton Screaming Eagles	Hamilton, Ontario			

=== Canadian football ===
==== Canadian Major Football League ====
===== Active teams =====
====== Alberta Football League ======
Team	City	Established	Sid Forster Memorial Trophy CMFL Championships	League Championships	Notes
Airdrie Irish	Airdrie, Alberta	2015	0	0	
Calgary Gators	Calgary, Alberta	1997	0	1	
Calgary Wolfpack	Calgary, Alberta	1989	3	12	
Central Alberta Buccaneers	Lacombe, Alberta	2002	0	0	Previously known as Red Deer Buccaneers
St. Albert Stars	St. Albert, Alberta	2013	0	0	
Fort McMurray Monarchs	Fort McMurray, Alberta	2014	1	1	
Grande Prairie Drillers	Grande Prairie, Alberta	2004	0	0	
Lloydminster Vandals	Lloydminster, Alberta	2004	1	2	
Parkland Predators	Spruce Grove, Alberta	2008	0	0	

====== Northern Football Conference ======
Team	City	Established	Sid Forster Memorial Trophy CMFL Championships	Plaunte Memorial Trophy (NFC) Championships	Notes
North Bay Bulldogs	North Bay, Ontario				
Oakville Longhorns	Oakville, Ontario	1978	3	14	Suspended operations for 2009. Returned 2010 Season.
Ottawa Invaders	Ottawa, Ontario	2010	0	0	Previously known as the Ottawa Invaders 2010-2017
Sarnia Imperials	Sarnia, Ontario	2006	0	0	
Steel City Patriots	Hamilton, Ontario	2014			
Sudbury Spartans	Sudbury, Ontario	1952	0	18	Previously known as Sudbury Hardrocks from 1952-67. Team suspended operations from 2007-2010. Returned 2011 Season.
Toronto Raiders	Toronto, Ontario	1992	0	0	Previously known as Toronto Eagles from 1992–97, Markham Raiders from 1998-2005.
GTA All-Stars	Toronto, Ontario	2001	3	5	Previously known as Megacity Maddogs from 2001–05 and Toronto Maddogs from 2006-2010.
Tri-City Outlaws	Kitchener, Ontario	2003	1	3	

===== Defunct teams =====
Team	City	Existence	CMFL Championships	AFL/MFL/NFC Championships	League	Notes
Bramalea Satellites	Bramalea, Ontario	1973-74	0	2	Northern Football Conference	
Brampton Bears	Brampton, Ontario	1985-95	0	1	Northern Football Conference	
Calgary Cowboys	Calgary, Alberta	1984-88; 1991–96	0	1	Alberta Football League	
Calgary Coyotes	Calgary, Alberta	2001-03	0	0	Alberta Football League	
Calgary Crude	Calgary, Alberta	1984-92	0	0	Alberta Football League	
Calgary Raiders	Calgary, Alberta	1985-88	0	4	Alberta Football League	
Calgary Razorbacks	Calgary, Alberta	2004-05	0	0	Alberta Football League	
Calgary Thunder	Calgary, Alberta	2000-07	0	1	Alberta Football League	
Deep River Rams	North Renfrew, Ontario	1956	0	1	Northern Football Conference	
East Side Eagles	Winnipeg, Manitoba		0		Manitoba Football League	
Edmonton Icemen	Edmonton, Alberta	1995–2004	0	0	Alberta Football League	
Edmonton Seahawks	Edmonton, Alberta	2006-09	0	0	Alberta Football League	
Edmonton Seminoles	Edmonton, Alberta	1993-94	0	0	Alberta Football League	
Etobicoke Argonauts	Etobicoke, Ontario	1978	0	0	Northern Football Conference	
Hamilton Wildcats I	Hamilton, Ontario	1978-84	0	3	Northern Football Conference	Moved from Stoney Creek to Hamilton and renamed from Stoney Creek Patriots to Hamilton Wildcats in 1982.
Hamilton Wildcats II	Hamilton, Ontario	1995-96	0	0	Northern Football Conference	
Kingston Privateers	Trenton, Ontario	2001-09	0	0	Northern Football Conference	Previously known as Belleville Privateers and Quinte-Limestone Privateers from 2004-08.
Kirkland Lake Kougars	Kirkland Lake, Ontario	1954-67	0	0	Northern Football Conference	Renamed from Alouettes to Kougars in 1968.
Laurentian Voyageurs	Sudbury, Ontario	1972-73	0	0	Northern Football Conference	
Medicine Hat Maurauders	Medicine Hat, Alberta	2004-08	0	0	Alberta Football League	
Milton Marauders	Milton, Ontario	2002	1	1	Northern Football Conference	
Mississauga Wolverines	Mississauga, Ontario	2001-03	0	0	Northern Football Conference	
North Bay Bulldogs	North Bay, Ontario	1992–2010	0	0	Northern Football Conference	
North Bay Northmen	North Bay, Ontario	1954-82	0	4	Northern Football Conference	Renamed from Roughriders to Ti-Cats and from Ti-Cats to Northmen in 1980.
Okotoks Bearcats	Okotoks, Alberta	1995-97	0	0	Alberta Football League	
Orillia Silver Bombers	Orillia, Ontario	1976-80	0	0	Northern Football Conference	
Oshawa Hawkeyes	Oshawa, Ontario	2001-08	1	1	Northern Football Conference	
Peterborough Packers	Peterborough, Ontario	1997-99	0	0	Northern Football Conference	
Red Deer Redskins	Red Deer, Alberta	1985-87	0	0	Alberta Football League	
Red Deer Sooners	Red Deer, Alberta	1987-99	0	4	Alberta Football League	
Rouyn-Noranda Fantassins	Rouyn-Noranda, Quebec	1955-57; 1961–62; 1965	0	0	Northern Football Conference	
St. Vital Bulldogs	St. Vital, Manitoba		0		Manitoba Football League	
Sault Ste. Marie Steelers	Sault Ste. Marie, Ontario	1972-88	0	2	Northern Football Conference	
Scarborough Crimson Tide	Scarborough, Ontario	1992-94	0	0	Northern Football Conference	
South Porcupine Falcons	Timmins, Ontario	1966-69; 1971	0	0	Northern Football Conference	
Sturgeon Falls Bombers	Sturgeon Falls, Ontario	1955-63; 1965–68	0	3	Northern Football Conference	
Thunder Bay Storm	Thunder Bay, Ontario	1993–1995	0	1	Manitoba Football League	
Tri-Town Raiders	Cobalt/Haileybury/New Liskeard, Ontario	1954-56; 1959	0	0	Northern Football Conference	
Val-d'Or Jets	Val-d'Or, Quebec	1965-68; 1970	0	0	Northern Football Conference	
Wainwright Longhorns	Wainwright, Alberta	2005-08	0	0	Alberta Football League	
Westman Wild	Brandon, Manitoba		0		Manitoba Football League	
Winnipeg Mustangs	Winnipeg, Manitoba		2	2	Manitoba Football League	
Winnipeg Rods	Winnipeg, Manitoba		0		Manitoba Football League	

==== Maritime Football League ====
===== Active teams =====
Team	City	Established	Maritime Bowls	Notes
Fredericton Fleet	Fredericton, New Brunswick	2021	0	
Halifax Heat	Halifax, Nova Scotia	2023	0	
Island Mariners	Charlottetown, Prince Edward Island	2004	0	Renamed from PEI Mariners in 2017
Moncton Mustangs	Riverview, New Brunswick	2005	8	Renamed from Riverview Mustangs to Moncton Mustangs in 2010.
Nova Scotia Buccaneers	Halifax, Nova Scotia	2015	1	Did not play in 2018
Saint John Wanderers	Saint John, New Brunswick	2001	8	
Valley Razors	Quispamsis, New Brunswick	2019	0	Renamed from Southern New Brunswick Ducks in 2022

===== Defunct teams =====
Team	City	Existed	Maritime Bowls	Notes
Capital Area Gladiators	Fredericton, New Brunswick	2001	0	
Dartmouth Knights	Dartmouth, Nova Scotia	2004	0	
Halifax Buccaneers	Halifax, Nova Scotia	2002	0	
Halifax Harbour Hawks	Halifax, Nova Scotia	2018	0	
Halifax Shockers	Halifax, Nova Scotia	2002	2	
Moncton Marshals	Moncton, New Brunswick	2001	1	Renamed from Maroonz to Marshals in 2002.
Saint John Longhorns	Saint John, New Brunswick	2005	0	Renamed from Simmonds to Saint John in 2006. Later merged with the Saint John Wanderers.
Super City Mean Green	Halifax, Nova Scotia	2008	0	
University of New Brunswick Saint John Wolves	Saint John, New Brunswick	2005	0	Renamed from Simmonds to SJ in 2004 and to UNBSJ Wolves upon receiving club status from the university in 2006. Moved to the newly formed Atlantic Football League in 2009.

== University ==
=== American football ===
==== National Association of Intercollegiate Athletics ====
===== Defunct teams =====
Team	City	Existence	Championships	Notes
Simon Fraser University Clan	Burnaby, British Columbia	1965–2002	0	Left the NAIA to join the CIS in 2002.

==== National Collegiate Athletic Association ====
===== Active team =====
====== Great Northwest Athletic Conference ======
Team	City	Established	Championships	Notes
Simon Fraser University Clan	Burnaby, British Columbia	2010	0	

=== Canadian football ===
==== U Sports ====
===== Active teams =====
====== Atlantic University Sport ======
Team	City	Established	Grey Cups	Vanier Cups	Canadian Bowl Championships	Notes
Acadia University Axemen	Wolfville, Nova Scotia	1956	0	2	0	
Bishop's University Gaiters	Lennoxville, Quebec	1873	0	0	0	Football-only member of AUS; other sports compete in RSEQ.
Mount Allison University Mounties	Sackville, New Brunswick	1955	0	0	0	
St. Francis Xavier University X-Men	Antigonish, Nova Scotia	1953	0	1	0	
Saint Mary's University Huskies	Halifax, Nova Scotia	1947	0	3	0	

====== Canada West Universities Athletic Association ======
Team	City	Established	Grey Cups	Vanier Cups	Canadian Bowl Championships	Notes
University of Alberta Golden Bears	Edmonton, Alberta	1910	0	3	0	
University of British Columbia Thunderbirds	Vancouver, British Columbia	1924	0	4	0	
University of Calgary Dinos	Calgary, Alberta	1964	0	5	0	Renamed from Dinosaurs to Dinos in 1999
University of Manitoba Bisons	Winnipeg, Manitoba	1927	0	3	0	
University of Regina Rams	Regina, Saskatchewan	1999	0	0	15	Moved from the CJFL after the 1998 season and joined the University of Regina as their varsity football program.
University of Saskatchewan Huskies	Saskatoon, Saskatchewan	1912	0	3	0	

====== Ontario University Athletics ======
Team	City	Established	Grey Cups	Vanier Cups	Canadian Bowl Championships	Notes
Carleton University Ravens	Ottawa, Ontario	1957	0	0	0	Program suspended from 1999 until 2013
University of Guelph Gryphons	Guelph, Ontario	1968	0	1	0	
McMaster University Marauders	Hamilton, Ontario	1898	0	1	0	
University of Ottawa Gee-Gees	Ottawa, Ontario	1905	0	2	0	
Queen's University Golden Gaels	Kingston, Ontario	1898	3	4	0	
University of Toronto Varsity Blues	Toronto, Ontario	1877	4	2	0	
University of Waterloo Warriors	Waterloo, Ontario	1957	0	0	0	
Western University Mustangs	London, Ontario	1929	0	8	1	The institution is formally The University of Western Ontario, but has branded itself as Western University since 2012.
Wilfrid Laurier University Golden Hawks	Waterloo, Ontario	1961	0	2	0	Renamed from Waterloo Lutheran University in 1960.
University of Windsor Lancers	Windsor, Ontario	1968	0	0	0	
York University Lions	Toronto, Ontario	1968	0	0	0	Renamed from Yeomen to Lions in 2003.

====== Réseau du sport étudiant du Québec ======
Team	City	Established	Grey Cups	Vanier Cups	Canadian Bowl Championships	Notes
Concordia University Stingers	Montreal, Quebec	1974	0	0	0	Became Concordia University in 1974 with the merger of Sir George Williams University and Loyola College.
Université Laval Rouge et Or	Quebec City, Quebec	1996	0	12	0	
McGill University Redbirds	Montreal, Quebec	1874	0	1	0	Nickname was Redmen from 1927 through the 2018 season, after which it was abandoned. The university then went without a men's nickname until the adoption of Redbirds in November 2020.
Université de Montréal Carabins	Montreal, Quebec	1966	0	3	0	Originally played from 1966–71, the program was then cancelled. It returned in 2002.
Université de Sherbrooke Vert et Or	Sherbrooke, Quebec	2003	0	0	0	

===== Defunct teams =====
Team	City	Existence	Grey Cups	Vanier Cups	Canadian Bowl Championships	Notes
Cape Breton University Capers	Sydney, Nova Scotia	1990	0	0	0	
Collège Militaire Royal	Saint-Jean-sur-Richelieu, Quebec	1953-57; 1965–66; 1971–72	0	0	0	
Dalhousie University Tigers	Halifax, Nova Scotia	1965-76	0	0	0	
Laurentian University Voyageurs	Sudbury, Ontario	1966-70	0	0	0	
Loyola College Warriors	Montreal, Quebec	1953-73	0	0	1	Merged with Sir George Williams University in 1974 to become Concordia University.
MacDonald College Aggies	Montreal, Quebec	1953-66	0	0	0	Merged with McGill University in 1972.
University of New Brunswick Red Bombers	Fredericton, New Brunswick	1965-80	0	0	0	
Ontario Agricultural College Aggies	Guelph, Ontario	1957-67	0	0	0	Became University of Guelph in 1968.
University of Prince Edward Island Panthers	Charlottetown, Prince Edward Island	1965-79	0	0	0	From 1965-1970 was known as St. Dunstan's University.
Ryerson Institute of Technology Rams	Toronto, Ontario	1949-1964	0	0	0	Won Intermediate Intercollegiate Ontario-Quebec Conference championship in 1958.
St. Patrick's College	Ottawa, Ontario	1953-66	0	0	0	Merged with Carleton University in 1967.
Royal Military College Redmen	Kingston, Ontario	1913; 1957–71	0	0	0	
Simon Fraser University Clan	Burnaby, British Columbia	2002-09	0	0	0	Joined U Sports (then CIS) in 2002, after playing NAIA football previously. Left CIS after the 2009 season to join NCAA Division II in the US.
Sir George Williams Georgians	Montreal, Quebec	1968-72	0	0	0	Merged with Loyola College in 1974 to become Concordia University.
Université du Québec à Montreal Citadins	Montreal, Quebec	1971-72	0	0	0	
Université du Québec à Trois-Rivières Patriotes	Trois-Rivières, Quebec	1971-73; 1977–79	0	0	0	

== Junior football ==
=== Canadian football ===
==== Canadian Junior Football League ====
===== Active teams =====
====== British Columbia Football Conference ======
Team	City	Established	Canadian Bowl Championships	Conference Championships	Notes
Langley Rams	Langley, British Columbia	1954	1	6	Renamed from Surrey to South Fraser in 1999 and South Fraser to Big Kahuna in 2006. Renamed from Big Kahuna Rams to Langley Rams following their relocation to Langley.
Valley Huskers	Chilliwack, British Columbia	1999	0	0	
Kamloops Broncos	Kamloops, British Columbia	2007	0	0	
Okanagan Sun	Kelowna, British Columbia	1980	3	14	
Vancouver Island Raiders	Nanaimo, British Columbia	2005	1	3	
Westshore Rebels	Langford, British Columbia	1985	0	1	Moved from Victoria to Langford in 2011 and renamed from Victoria Rebels.
Prince George Kodiaks	Prince George, British Columbia	2022	0	0	

====== Ontario Football Conference ======
Team	City	Established	Canadian Bowl Championships	Conference Championships	Notes
Hamilton Hurricanes	Hamilton, Ontario	1963	1	9	Went dormant from 1994 until 2007. Was reinstated for the 2008 season.
London Beefeaters	London, Ontario	1975	0	0	
Ottawa Sooners	Ottawa, Ontario	1974	4	10	Played in the Quebec Junior Football League from 1995 until 2008.
St. Clair Saints	Windsor, Ontario	1929	4	6	Previously the Windsor AKO Fratmen, acquired by St. Clair College
Quinte Riptides	Belleville, Ontario	2021	0	0	Called the Quinte Skyhawks from 2021-2025
Saulte College Cougars	Saulte Ste Marie, Ontario	2025	0	1	Operated by Sault College

====== Prairie Football Conference ======
Team	City	Established	Canadian Bowl Championships	Conference Championships	Notes
Calgary Colts	Calgary, Alberta	1967	2	2	
Edmonton Huskies	Edmonton, Alberta	1952	5	3	Renamed from Oilers to Huskies in 1954.
Edmonton Wildcats	Edmonton, Alberta	1948	3	2	
Regina Thunder	Regina, Saskatchewan	1999	0	0	
Saskatoon Hilltops	Saskatoon, Saskatchewan	1947	24	19	
Winnipeg Rifles	Winnipeg, Manitoba	2002	0	0	

===== Defunct teams =====
Team	City	Existence	Canadian Bowl Championships	Notes
Abbotsford Air Force	Abbotsford, British Columbia	1987–2007	0	Suspended operations for the 2007 season.
Brampton Satellites	Brampton, Ontario	1975-78	0	
Brampton Bears	Brampton, Ontario	2010-	0	
Brantford Bisons	Brantford, Ontario	1971-82	0	
Burnaby/Northwest Mountaineers	Burnaby, British Columbia		0	
Burnaby Spartans	Burnaby, British Columbia		0	
Burlington Braves	Burlington, Ontario	1958-2015	0	Relocated to Niagara and become the Niagara Raiders
Calgary Altonas	Calgary, Alberta		1	
Calgary Mohawks	Calgary, Alberta	1974-	0	
Calgary Mount Royal Mustangs	Calgary, Alberta		0	
Chateauguay Ramblers	Châteauguay, Quebec		0	
Cornwall Emards	Cornwall, Ontario		0	
C.Y.O. Red Raiders	British Columbia		0	
Edmonton Maple Leafs	Edmonton, Alberta		0	
Etobicoke Argonauts	Toronto, Ontario	1979-81	0	
Fort Garry Lions	Winnipeg, Manitoba	1957	0	
GTA Grizzlies	Toronto, Ontario	2014-2025	0	Finished 0-8 with a points differential of -392 in 2025. Withdrew prior to 2026 season
Hamilton Alerts	Hamilton, Ontario		2	
Hamilton Italio Canadians	Hamilton, Ontario		1	
Hamilton Petrolia	Hamilton, Ontario		1	
Hamilton Steel City Ironmen	Hamilton, Ontario	1999–2000	0	
Hamilton Tiger-Cats	Hamilton, Ontario		2	
Hamilton Tigers	Hamilton, Ontario		1	
Hamilton Wildcats	Hamilton, Ontario		2	
Kamloops Cowboys	Kamloops, British Columbia	2001-03	0	
Etobicoke-Lakeshore Bears	Ontario	1957-78	0	
Laval Cobras	Laval, Quebec		0	
Laval Scorpions	Laval, Quebec		0	
Loyola College	Montreal, Quebec		1	
Marpole Colts	British Columbia		0	
Medicine Hat Rattlers	Medicine Hat, Alberta		0	
Montreal AAA	Montreal, Quebec		4	
Montreal Junior Alouettes	Montreal, Quebec	1981	0	
Montreal Junior Concordes	Montreal, Quebec	1982-84	0	
Montreal Rose Bombers	Montreal, Quebec		1	
Montreal Westmounts	Montreal, Quebec		1	
Moose Jaw Maroons	Moose Jaw, Saskatchewan		0	
Niagara Falls Regional Raiders	Niagara Falls, Ontario	1973-76	0	
Niagara Raiders	St Catherines, Ontario	2016-2020	0	
Niagara Falls Thunderbirds	Niagara Falls, Ontario	1962	0	
Niagara Falls Tiger-Cats	Niagara Falls, Ontario	1963	0	
North Shore Cougars	Vancouver, British Columbia		0	
North York Knights	Toronto, Ontario	1959-60	0	
Notre-Dame-de-Grace Maple Leafs	Montreal, Quebec	1946-73	1	Merged with Verdun Invictus in 1974 to become Verdun Maple Leafs.
Oakville Colts	Oakville, Ontario	1971-73	0	
Oshawa Hawkeyes	Oshawa, Ontario	1963-96	0	
Oshawa Imperials	Oshawa, Ontario	1959-62	0	
Ottawa Capitals	Ottawa, Ontario		1	
Ottawa Junior Riders	Ottawa, Ontario	2002-05	0	
Parkdale Canoe Club	Toronto, Ontario		1	
Peterborough Panthers	Peterborough, Ontario	1971-75	0	
Red Deer Packers	Red Deer, Alberta	1974-	0	
Regina Bombers	Regina, Saskatchewan		0	
Regina Dales	Regina, Saskatchewan		1	
Regina Pats	Regina, Saskatchewan		1	
Regina Rams	Regina, Saskatchewan		15	Joined the University of Regina and CIS in 1999.
Richmond Raiders	Richmond, British Columbia		0	
Sarnia Junior Golden Bears	Sarnia, Ontario	1974-80	0	
Sarnia Lakers	Sarnia, Ontario	1971-73	0	
Sault Ste. Marie Storm	Sault Ste. Marie, Ontario	1993-95	0	
Scarborough Rams	Toronto, Ontario	1959-78	0	
St. Catharines Raiders	St. Catharines, Ontario		0	
St. James Rods	St. James, Manitoba		0	
St. John's Grads	Winnipeg, Manitoba		1	
St-Leonard Cougars	Montreal, Quebec	1986-2013	0	
St. Thomas Tigers	St. Thomas, Ontario		1	
St. Vital Mustangs	St. Vital, Manitoba		0	
South Shore Packers	Montreal, Quebec		0	
Thunder Bay Giants	Thunder Bay, Ontario		0	
Thunder Bay Storm	Thunder Bay, Ontario	1995	0	
Tri-City Bulldogs	Coquitlam, British Columbia	1925–2004	0	Renamed from the Vancouver Meloramas when it moved to Coquitlam in 1991.
Toronto Argos	Toronto, Ontario		2	
Toronto Balmy Beach Marines	Toronto, Ontario	1959-62	0	
Toronto Canoe Club	Toronto, Ontario		1	
Toronto Parkdale Lions	Toronto, Ontario		1	
Toronto St. Aldens	Toronto, Ontario		1	
Toronto St. Michael's	Toronto, Ontario		1	
Toronto Titans	Toronto, Ontario	2003	0	Suspended operations prior to the 2003 season.
Toronto Varsity	Toronto, Ontario		1	
Tri-City Vipers	Kitchener, Ontario	2007	0	Suspended operations prior to the 2007 season, but is expected to return for the 2008 season.
University of Toronto Junior Varsity Blues	Toronto, Ontario	1961	0	
Vancouver Blue Bombers	Vancouver, British Columbia		2	
Vancouver Island Sharks	Victoria, British Columbia	1994-97	0	
Verdun Invictus	Verdun, Quebec		0	Merged With Notre-Dame-de-Grace Maple Leafs to become Verdun Maple Leafs.
Verdun Maple Leafs	Verdun, Quebec	1974-80	0	
Verdun Shamcats	Verdun, Quebec		0	
Victoria Dolphins	Victoria, British Columbia		0	
Victoria Payless	Victoria, British Columbia		0	
Ville Emard Juveniles	Ville Emard, Quebec		0	
Western Ontario Mustangs	London, Ontario		1	
Weston Invictus Redmen	Weston, Ontario	1961-70	0	
Weston Wildcats	Winnipeg, Manitoba		0	
Winnipeg Hawkeyes	Winnipeg, Manitoba	1974-	0	
Winnipeg Light Infantry	Winnipeg, Manitoba		0	
Winnipeg Rods	Winnipeg, Manitoba	1974-	3	
Winnipeg Wildcats	Winnipeg, Manitoba		0	
Woodstock Grads	Woodstock, Ontario		1	

==== Quebec Junior Football League ====
===== Active teams =====
Team	City	Established	Canadian Bowl Championships	Manson Cups	Notes
Châteauguay Raiders	Châteauguay, Quebec	1981	0	7	
Cumberland Panthers	Orléans, Ontario	1993	0	0	
Joliette Pirates	Joliette, Quebec	1992	0	0	
Laval Devils	Laval, Quebec	2002	0	0	
South Shore Monarx	Longueuil, Quebec	2004	0	0	
St. Lazare Stallions	Saint Lazare De Vaudreuil, Quebec	2008	0	0	

===== Defunct teams =====
Team	City	Existence	Canadian Bowl Championships	Manson Cups	Notes
North Shore Broncos	Pierrefonds, Quebec	1972–2007	4	0	
Ottawa Sooners	Ottawa, Ontario	1995–2008	5	3	Moved to the CJFL for the 2009 season.
South Shore Packers	Greenfield Park, Quebec	1995–2001	0	0	
Valleyfield Phalanges	Salaberry-de-Valleyfield, Quebec	1971–2007	0	0	
Ottawa Jr. Riders	Ottawa, Ontario	1997–2013	0	3	

==== Atlantic Football League ====
===== Active teams =====
Team	City	Established	Moosehead Cups	Notes
Dalhousie University Tigers	Halifax, Nova Scotia	2010	6	
Holland College Hurricanes	Charlottetown, Prince Edward Island	2010	4	
University of New Brunswick Fredericton Red Bombers	Fredericton, New Brunswick	2009	5	
Saint John Falcons	Saint John, New Brunswick	2024	0	

===== Defunct teams =====
Team	City	Existence	Moosehead Cups	Notes
Moncton Jr. Mustangs	Moncton, New Brunswick	2009-2010	0	Founded as Moncton Raiders; renamed for 2010
UNBSJ Seawolves	Saint John, New Brunswick	2009-2023	1	

== Varsity football ==
=== Canadian football ===
==== Ontario Football Conference ====
===== Active teams =====
Team	City	Established	OFC (Varsity) Championships	Notes
Burlington Stampeders	Burlington, Ontario	1966	1	
Hamilton Jr. Tiger Cats	Hamilton, Ontario	2009	0	
Sudbury Spartans	Sudbury, Ontario	1952	0	
Toronto Junior Argonauts	Toronto, Ontario	2006	0	
Waterloo Jr. Warriors	Kitchener and Waterloo, Ontario	2011	0	
York Jr. Lions	York Region, Ontario	2003	0	
Forest City Thunderbirds	London, Ontario	2000	0	
London Jr. Mustangs	London, Ontario	2011	12	

===== Defunct teams =====
Team	City	Existed	OFC (Varsity) Championships	Notes
York-Simcoe Buccaneers	York Region, Ontario	2003-2015		
Waterloo Region Predators	Kitchener And Waterloo, Ontario	2011-2022		

==== Ontario Varsity Football League ====
Team	City	Established	OVFL Championships	Notes
Brampton Bulldogs	Brampton, Ontario		0	
Brantford Bisons	Brantford, Ontario		0	
Cambridge Lions	Cambridge, Ontario		0	
Essex Ravens	Essex, Ontario		1	
Etobicoke Eagles	Toronto, Ontario		1	
Guelph Bears	Guelph, Ontario		0	
Halton Invictas	Burlington, Ontario		0	
Hamilton Ironmen	Hamilton, Ontario		0	
Huronia Stallions	Barrie, Ontario		0	
Kingston Grenadiers	Kingston, Ontario		0	Renamed from Limestone District to Kingston in 2007.
London Jr.Mustangs	London, Ontario		1	
Metro Toronto Wildcats	Toronto, Ontario		0	
Mississauga Warriors	Mississauga, Ontario		3	
Newmarket Storm	Newmarket, Ontario		0	Renamed from York Simcoe to Newmarket in 2007.
Niagara Spears	St. Catharines, Ontario		1	
Oshawa Hawkeyes	Oshawa, Ontario		0	
Ottawa Cumberland Panthers	Cumberland, Ontario		0	
Ottawa Myers Riders	Nepean, Ontario		0	
Sarnia Lions	Sarnia, Ontario		0	Renamed from Lambton to Sarnia in 2007.
Sault Ste. Marie Sabercats	Sault Ste. Marie, Ontario		0	
Toronto Thunder	Toronto, Ontario		3	

== Women's football ==
=== Canadian football ===
==== Central Canadian Women's Football League ====
Team	City	Established	CCWFL Championships	Notes
Montreal Blitz	Montreal, Quebec	2001	1	Played in the American Independent Women's Football League (2001–2016); won the 2012 IWFL Tier I championship and two Tier II championships.
Ottawa Capital Rebels	Ottawa, Ontario	2020	0	
Quebec City Phoenix	Quebec City, Quebec	2022	0	

==== Maritime Women's Football League ====
Team	City	Established	MWFL Championships	Notes
Capital Area Lady Gladiators	Fredericton, New Brunswick	2004	4	
Halifax Xplosion	Halifax, Nova Scotia	2006	2 (1 shared)	
Moncton Vipers	Moncton, New Brunswick	2005	2	
PEI Island Demons	Prince Edward Island	2019	0	
Saint John Storm	Saint John, New Brunswick	2004	11 (1 shared)	Formerly known as the Simonds SeaGals in 2004, Saint John Buccaneers from 2005-07.

==== Western Women's Canadian Football League ====
===== Western Conference =====
Team	City	Established	WWCFL championships	Notes
Calgary Rage	Calgary, Alberta	2011	0	
Edmonton Arctic Pride	Edmonton, Alberta	2025	0	
Lethbridge Steel	Lethbridge, Alberta	2011	0	

===== Prairie Conference =====
Team	City	Established	WWCFL Championships	Notes
Manitoba Fearless	Winnipeg, Manitoba	2011	0	
Regina Riot	Regina, Saskatchewan	2011	3	
Saskatoon Valkyries	Saskatoon, Saskatchewan	2011	7	
Winnipeg Nomads Wolf Pack	Winnipeg, Manitoba	2011	0	

=== Indoor football/arena football ===
==== Lingerie Football League Canada ====
===== Defunct teams =====
Team	City	Established	Lingerie Bowl	Notes
BC Angels	Abbotsford, British Columbia	2012	1	
Calgary Fillies	Calgary, Alberta	2013	0	
Regina Rage	Regina, Saskatchewan	2012	0	
Saskatoon Sirens	Saskatoon, Saskatchewan	2012	0	
Toronto Triumph	Toronto, Ontario	2011	0	

== See also ==
- North American Indoor Football League (2005)
- Professional football in Canada
