= 2013 LFL Canada season =

Never-played season of LFL Canada

2013 LFL Canada
- Duration: September 13, 2013 – November 9, 2013

LFL Canada Legends Cup 2013
- Date: November 16, 2013
- Venue: Stampede Corral, Calgary

Seasons
- ← 2014 US

The 2013 LFL Canada Season would have been the second season of LFL Canada and the sixth season of the combined history of the Legends Football League and its predecessor, the Lingerie Football League. LFL Canada intended to feature four teams in four cities across Western Canada, with the Calgary Fillies to replace the suspended Toronto Triumph; Calgary was to join the BC Angels, Regina Rage and the Saskatoon Sirens.

The 2013 season never transpired, and LFL announced, in July 2014, that LFL Canada had been terminated and the teams would fold into a (never formed) LFL North America.

== Aborted developments ==
On June 27, 2013, the 2013 LFL Canada schedule was released. The 2013 regular season was scheduled to begin on September 13, 2013 and conclude on November 9, 2013, with the Legends Cup championship scheduled to be played on November 16, 2013 at Stampede Corral in Calgary, Alberta.

It was announced that a Calgary, Alberta team would join the LFL and be known as the Calgary Fillies, playing home games at the Stampede Corral. As well, the LFL announced that the Toronto Triumph would suspend operations for the 2013 season, ostensibly due to arena concerns.

On September 11, 2013, Ticketmaster began notifying ticket holders in Saskatoon that the team's first home game against Calgary has been cancelled. No reasons were given for the cancellation, nor a rescheduled date provided.

Legends Football League then moved the season opener to October 5, then cancelled the 2013 Season before that revised start date. The LFL first blamed a lack of preparation time for the teams due to three new coaching staffs (all except Saskatoon), then confirmed that the league office was not prepared, the stated the inability of USA players to be available to practice with Canadian teams.

The LFL stated that it would be properly prepared for the 2014 season, but in July 2014 announced that LFL Canada had been terminated, with plans to fold the teams into a (never formed) LFL North America, joining teams from the US and Mexico.

== Teams ==
2013 Teams
Team	Arena and Location
BC Angels	Abbotsford Entertainment & Sports Centre (Abbotsford, British Columbia)
Calgary Fillies	Stampede Corral (Calgary, Alberta)
Regina Rage	Brandt Centre (Regina, Saskatchewan)
Saskatoon Sirens	Credit Union Centre (Saskatoon, Saskatchewan)

== Schedule ==
Date	Visitor	Home	Kickoff	Venue	Score	Game Recap
Friday, September 13	Saskatoon Sirens	BC Angels		Abbotsford Entertainment & Sports Centre		
Saturday, September 14	Regina Rage	Calgary Fillies		Stampede Corral		
Saturday, September 21	Saskatoon Sirens	Regina Rage		Brandt Centre - Cancelled		
Saturday, September 28	Calgary Fillies	Saskatoon Sirens		Credit Union Centre - Cancelled		
Saturday, October 5	Calgary Fillies	Regina Rage		Brandt Centre		
Sunday, October 6	BC Angels	Saskatoon Sirens		Credit Union Centre		
Saturday, October 19	Bye Week					
Thursday, October 24	Regina Rage	BC Angels		Abbotsford Entertainment & Sports Centre		
Saturday, November 2	Bye Week					
Saturday, November 9	BC Angels	Calgary Fillies		Stampede Corral		

== LFL Canada Legends Cup ==
Date	Visitor	Home	Kickoff	Venue	Score	Game Recap
Saturday, November 16	TBD	TBD		Stampede Corral		

== Standings ==
Team	Wins	Loss	Ties	Pct	PF	PA	Net Pts	TD's	Home Record	Home Pct	Road Record	Road Pct
BC Angels	0	0	0	0.000	0	0	0	0	0-0	0.000	0-0	0.000
Calgary Fillies	0	0	0	0.000	0	0	0	0	0-0	0.000	0-0	0.000
Regina Rage	0	0	0	0.000	0	0	0	0	0-0	0.000	0-0	0.000
Saskatoon Sirens	0	0	0	0.000	0	0	0	0	0-0	0.000	0-0	0.000
