= Calgary Fillies =

Proposed women's American football team

- Established: 2013
- Folded: 2013
- Based in: Calgary, Alberta, Canada
- Home field: Stampede Corral
- Owner(s): Lingerie Football League, LLC
- League: Legends Football League
- Division: LFL Canada
- Colours: Red, white, and black

The Calgary Fillies were a proposed women's football expansion team in the Legends Football League (LFL) that was to begin play in the 2013 LFL Canada season. Based in Calgary, Alberta, the Fillies were to play their home games at the Stampede Corral.

== History ==
The Legends Football League (LFL) announced on June 27, 2013, that an expansion franchise was granted to Calgary, following a failed effort in 2012 due to a failed lease negotiation with ScotiaBank Saddledome. A series of public tryouts were held on July 7 at the Genesis Centre and on July 20.

The original head coach for the Fillies was Jarrod Neufeld and the team manager was Daniel Reaume. For the 2013 season, each Canadian team was to have three players from the LFL US. The US competitors assigned to the Fillies were Angela Rypien of the Baltimore Charm, Tamar Fennell, and Theresa Petruziello of the Cleveland Crush.

The team's first game was scheduled for September 14, 2013, and then rescheduled for October 5 due to concerns from all the teams in the league not being adequately prepared. In early September, it was confirmed that eight players and volunteers had stepped away. There were safety concerns as equipment was supposedly received only two weeks before their planned September debut. Complaints included that the equipment were used shoulder pads and helmets. Concerns existed over the gear being too light and not safe enough and could cause concussions.

The athletes that left the team indicated that there were also many organizational issues within the league. The Legends Football League replied on September 16, 2013, by announcing that there would not be a season in 2013. Despite the fact that several players had left the franchise, a second round of tryouts was held on September 14 at the Calgary Soccer Centre in Calgary.

The LFL Canada never returned.

=== Proposed 2013 schedule ===
Date	Opponent	Venue
September 14	Regina Rage	Stampede Corral
September 28	Saskatoon Sirens	Credit Union Centre
October 5	Regina Rage	Brandt Centre
November 9	BC Angels	Stampede Corral
