= Bramalea Satellites =

Canadian football team (1967–1979)

General information
- Founded: 1967; 59 years ago
- Folded: 1979; 47 years ago
- Headquartered: Chinguacousy Township, Ontario; Brampton, Ontario
- Colours

League / conference affiliations
- Ontario Rugby Football Union 1967–1970; Northern Football Conference 1973–1974; Canadian Junior Football League - Ontario Football Conference 1975–1979

Bramalea Satellites was a member of the Ontario Rugby Football Union, a senior league that preceded the Canadian Football League. When the ORFU ceased, it transferred over to the Northern Football Conference for the 1973 and 1974 seasons, and the Ontario junior level after that.

The team name is in reference to Bramalea being a "satellite city", as opposed to an orbiting object.

The team was created in 1967 when a previous franchise in the OFRU, the East York Argos, relocated from the previously independent municipality of East York, which had changed its legal status to a borough within Toronto that same year.

== History ==
=== Ontario Rugby Football Union ===
The team practiced five evenings a week at Bramalea Secondary School, and had cheerleaders.

==== 1967 ====
John Bennett came out of retirement to coach the team in their new location, having sat out the 1966 season. Their team included John Bennett, a former McGill star, and Doug McNichol, a former Montreal Alouette and Toronto Argonaut. On October 23, the London Lords gave them their first defeat in two years.

The Satellites met the London Lords again at the 1967 ORFU championship, receiving a loss in the first of the two-game season, due to "over-confidence". Despite an illegal intrusion from the bench, the team won the championship, with a two-game total of 27-24. The Lords filed an official protest with the league, asking for the second game to be replayed.

In November 1967, the Chateauguay Ramblers faced off against the Satellites in the Eastern Football Conference finals in Montreal, winning 33-13; the Ramblers noted after the game that several of their players were injured, and shouldn't have been playing. (In one of the games leading up to the finals, the team beat the Halifax Marcom Flyers 47-7.)

Before the Canadian Amateur Football Association senior championship versus the St. Vital Bulldogs, team vice-president Bob Orr publicly worried about when the "law of averages" would catch up with the team, having won 54 out of the previous 56 games. They won their fourth consecutive national win, at a "rain drenched" the Etobicoke Centennial Stadium, 4-0. The team expected that many players would retire after the game. (The opposing team's lead rusher, Don Kuyrk, rescheduled his wedding four times while the CAFA changed its dates.)

The Toronto Argonauts released eight season vet Jim Copeland, a mainstay of their punt return team; he joined the team, getting 20 touchdowns en route to the ORFU championships. After the win and an injury on the Argos, he rejoined the CFL as a backup man to Mike Wickum, missing the Eastern and Canadian senior championships.

==== 1968 ====
Their quarterback this season was John Henry Jackson. The team had a slow start, with their first win coming in their fifth game, beating Sarnia Imperials 39-0; among their early bouts that season, they lost 47-0 to the Downriver Indians team, newly moved to Windsor. By late September, the team was tied for second place in the league, with the St. Catherines Rams.

Having played with the Calgary Stampeders in 1967, Ed Aru spent the 1968 season with Bramalea, being drafted to the Argos in 1969.

==== 1969 ====
In mid-October, the team moved into a tie for first place in the league, with the St. Catherine Rams.

Released at the start of the Canadian Football League season, Toronto Argonauts player Tom Johansen went to play with the Satellites. When Argos player Dave Mann was injured, he was "instantly" available to the Argos. As taxi squads were not permitted by the CFL, this and halfback Dickie Moore's availability was widely questioned. Around a dozen former Argos played on the Bramalea team in the 1969 season.

=== Northern Football Conference ===
Both the London Lords and Bramalea Satellites applied to join the Northern Football Conference; both were accepted, but London never followed through.

In both the 1973 and 1974 seasons, the team was unbeaten. They beat the Sudbury Spartans for the James Pestolis Memorial Trophy and Donald Plaunt Memorial Trophy. Following three teams being declined for the 1975 season (Sudbury Spartans, North Bay Ti-Cats and Sault Ste. Marie Steelers), the Satellites withdrew to compete at the Ontario junior level.

It was quite successful during its time in the NFC. Rick Morenz was the NFC's leading scorer in 1973, with 102, and Stu Wright in 1974, with 127. Angelo Raggin was the Lineman of the Year in 1973, Buddy Bendall in 1974. The Sid Forster Memorial Coach of the Year went to Bubba Marriott in 1973.

Morenz is the only NFC Hall of Fame player from Bramalea, being inducted in 1990. He holds the league's all-time Touchdowns - Rushing record, with six, in a 1973 game versus the North Bay Ti-Cats.

=== Ontario Football Conference ===
The Satellites transferred to the Canadian Junior Football League's Ontario Football Conference in 1975. Players at this level are 17 to 22.

Partway through the 1978 OFC season, the Lakeshore Bears and Scarborough Rams folded. The resulting realignment paired Brampton with the Oshawa Hawkeyes, Sarnia Golden Bears, Brantford Bisons, and St. Catherines Raiders, considered by sports media as the weaker division.

Brampton itself folded at the end of the season, with the two divisions combined. It holds no records.

==== OFC standings ====
Season	W	L	T	PF	PA	Pts	Finish	Playoffs
1975	1	9	0	2	43	392	Tied last, Eastern CJFL	
1976	0	8	0	0	27	270	Last, Eastern CJFL	
1977	2	8	0	4	75	258	5th of 6, Eastern CJFL	
1978	3	4	2	8	66	222	Last, Eastern CJFL	
