= 2012 LFL Canada season =

2012 LFL Canada
- Duration: August 25, 2012 – October 27, 2012

Lingerie Bowl Canada I
- Date: November 17, 2012
- Venue: Abbotsford Entertainment & Sports Centre, Abbotsford
- Champions: BC Angels

Seasons
- 2011-12 US 2013 US

The 2012 LFL Canada Season was the fourth season in the Lingerie Football League. LFL Canada features four teams in four cities across Canada. For the 2012 season the League granted three new franchises: BC Angels, Regina Rage and the Saskatoon Sirens. The Toronto Triumph, who began play in the LFL's original U.S. league in 2011, carried over to LFL Canada; they have moved from the Ricoh Coliseum to the Hershey Centre in Mississauga, Ontario.

Unlike previous seasons, for this season the LFL would only play in Canada, with the exception of a handful of exhibition games around the world. The LFL announced in April 2012 that its U.S. teams would not play their 2012 season, anticipating a move to a spring schedule.

LFL Canada Lingerie Bowl I was played on November 17, 2012, between the Saskatoon Sirens and the BC Angels at the Abbotsford Entertainment & Sports Centre in Abbotsford, British Columbia, one week before the CFL's Grey Cup. The BC Angels won the inaugural championship game 25-12 with BC Angels' quarterback Mary Ann Hanson the game's MVP.

== Developments ==
On February 9, 2012, the LFL announced that Abbotsford, British Columbia, would be the next Canadian city to host a team in the League. The franchise would play its home games at the Abbotsford Entertainment & Sports Centre and will compete in the Western Division of LFL Canada. On February 20, 2012, the LFL announced that the franchise will be named the BC Angels following the results of an online fan vote. The decision for Abbotsford to host a team sparked some controversy, including expressed concern from at least one city councillor, as "Abbotsford is a deeply religious agricultural community."

On February 22, 2012, the LFL announced that Regina, Saskatchewan would be the next Canadian city to host a team in the League. Home games would be played at the Brandt Centre. On March 6, the LFL announced that the franchise will be named the Regina Rage after an online fan vote.

Six days later, on February 28, the LFL announced that Saskatoon, Saskatchewan would join Regina as LFL Canada's second team in the Wheat Province. Home games would be played at the Credit Union Centre. Upon releasing the Saskatoon Sirens' logo and colours, the league announced that LFL Canada was set at four teams for the 2012 season, with the league playing an eight-game schedule, still scheduled to end with the Canadian Lingerie Bowl the day before the Grey Cup. The Canadian Lingerie Bowl was later rescheduled to start one week before the Grey Cup, due in part to a schedule conflict with the Vanier Cup, the Canadian college football championship.

== Teams ==
2012 Teams
Team	Arena and Location
BC Angels	Abbotsford Entertainment & Sports Centre (Abbotsford, British Columbia)
Regina Rage	Brandt Centre (Regina, Saskatchewan)
Saskatoon Sirens	Credit Union Centre (Saskatoon, Saskatchewan)
Toronto Triumph	Hershey Centre (Mississauga, Ontario)

== Schedule ==
The 2012 season featured eight games, all scheduled on Saturdays, with each team playing two home and two road games. As the LFL has done in the United States, the league scheduled a bye week on Thanksgiving weekend. In addition a second bye week was built into the schedule for the week of September 22, 2012.

Date	Visitor	Home	Kickoff	Venue	Score	Game Recap
August 25, 2012	Regina Rage	BC Angels	8:00 PM	Abbotsford Entertainment & Sports Centre	BC 41; Regina 18	Recap
September 1, 2012	BC Angels	Saskatoon Sirens	8:00 PM	Credit Union Centre	Saskatoon 22; BC 18	Recap
September 8, 2012	Toronto Triumph	Regina Rage	8:00 PM	Brandt Centre	Regina 40; Toronto 32	
September 15, 2012	Saskatoon Sirens	Toronto Triumph	8:00 PM	Hershey Centre	Saskatoon 44; Toronto 22	Recap
September 29, 2012	Toronto Triumph	BC Angels	8:00 PM	Abbotsford Entertainment & Sports Centre	BC 31; Toronto 27	Recap
October 6, 2012	Regina Rage	Saskatoon Sirens	8:00 PM	Credit Union Centre	Regina 26; Saskatoon 20	Recap
October 21, 2012	Saskatoon Sirens	Regina Rage	3:00 PM	Brandt Centre	Saskatoon 35; Regina 33	
October 27, 2012	BC Angels	Toronto Triumph	8:00 PM	Hershey Centre	Toronto 22; BC 8	Recap
2012 Pacific Cup
December 15, 2012	BC Angels	Seattle Mist	8:00 PM	ShoWare Center	Seattle 38; BC 18	Recap

== Lingerie Bowl Canada I ==
Date	Visitor	Home	Kickoff	Venue	Score	Game Recap
November 17, 2012	BC Angels	Saskatoon Sirens	5:00 PM	Abbotsford Entertainment & Sports Centre	BC 25; Saskatoon 12	Recap

== Standings ==
Team	Wins	Loss	Ties	Pct	PF	PA	Net Pts	TD's	Home Record	Home Pct	Road Record	Road Pct
* Saskatoon Sirens	3	1	0	.750	121	99	22	17	1-1	.500	2-0	1.000
* BC Angels	2	2	0	.500	98	89	9	15	2-0	1.000	0-2	.000
^ Regina Rage	2	2	0	.500	117	128	-11	18	1-1	.500	1-1	.500
^ Toronto Triumph	1	3	0	.250	103	133	-30	14	1-1	.500	0-2	.000

* - clinched playoff berth ^ - eliminated from playoffs
