= MWFL =

MWFL may refer to:

- Mid West Football League, an Australian rules football competition based in the Eyre Peninsula region of South Australia
- Maritime Women's Football League, a Canadian football league in eastern Canada
- Midwest Football League (1935–1940), a minor professional American football league
- Midwest Football League (1962–1978), a minor professional American football league
- Midwest Football League (2002–), a semi-professional American football league whose Ohio River Bearcats team played at the Goebel Soccer Complex
