= Professional football in Canada =

Professional gridiron football is one of the most popular sports in Canada. Unlike most countries, but paralleling its counterpart, the United States, football in Canada refers to the gridiron-based game developed in both countries over the course of the late 19th and early 20th centuries, and not to association football (which is known in Canada as soccer).

== Professional Canadian football ==
Only one professional football league has a permanent presence in Canada: the Canadian Football League (CFL), an organization founded in 1958 to accommodate the ongoing trend of professionalism in the Canadian football ranks since the 1940s. The CFL, like most amateur Canadian football leagues, plays on a larger field using a rulebook with several significant rule differences compared to the game as it is played in the United States. The league is composed of two divisions and nine teams in most of the largest Canadian markets, with at least one team in each province between British Columbia (BC Lions) and Quebec (Montreal Alouettes) inclusive. The only presence in Atlantic Canada is a semi-regular series of games in New Brunswick and Nova Scotia (Touchdown Atlantic) and a smattering of earlier preseason contests. The CFL operates a two-week preseason beginning in May, an 18-game regular season from June to October, and a six-team playoff tournament, culminating in the Grey Cup on the third Sunday of November.

== Professional American football ==
Several attempts to place franchises playing American football rules in Canada have occurred over the course of history:

- The Los Angeles Wildcats of the American Football League (1926), as part of its travelling schedule, played one of its games in Toronto. The game introduced the first forward passes on Canadian soil (Canadian football did not allow the move until three years later).
- The Quebec Rifles joined the United Football League (1961–1964) in the league's final year, then relocated to Toronto and joined the Continental Football League for two seasons (1965–1967) and were known as the Toronto Rifles. The Continental Football League placed another franchise in Montreal, known as the Montreal Beavers, who played for two seasons (1966–1967); a third, the Victoria Steelers (originally of the semi-pro Pacific Football League), played one season (1967) in the Continental league.
- The Toronto Northmen were a World Football League franchise, but never played a game due to the introduction of a bill proposing the Canadian Football Act. The bill was prompted by fears that the WFL might usurp the CFL. The mere threat of the bill's passage prompted the franchise to leave Canada before playing; it became the Memphis Southmen. (The WFL later played one game in London, Ontario, without objections.) Likewise, an attempt to put what would become the United States Football League's Tampa Bay Bandits in Hamilton was thwarted when a senator threatened to reintroduce a similar bill.
- The Montreal Machine were a World League of American Football franchise who played two seasons in 1991 and 1992.

The Toronto Phantoms were a franchise of the Arena Football League who played two seasons in 2001 and 2002. Until 2017, they were the only professional indoor American football team to have attempted to take root in Canada; a second attempt, the Niagara Spartans (run by the established semi-pro Steel City Patriots team in the Hamilton area), played in the Can-Am Indoor Football League; the Spartans had their season cut short after four games, all on the road, when international border issues with the league's American teams proved to be unworkable.

The Montreal Blitz played in the Independent Women's Football League from 2001 to 2015, and the Women's Football Alliance since 2017.

The National Football League, the dominant professional football league in the United States, also has a large following in Canada due in part to significant media exposure. The NFL has occasionally played games in Toronto (as well as, more sporadically, other Canadian cities) over the course of its history but has never attempted to permanently place a team there. The Bills Toronto Series was the NFL's most direct presence in Canada; in that series, which ran from 2008 to 2013, the Buffalo Bills played one of their regular season home games in Toronto's Rogers Centre.

== See also ==
- List of gridiron football teams in Canada
