= Canadian Major Football League =

Canadian sports governing body

- Sport: Canadian football
- Founded: 1999
- No. of teams: 15 (as of 2021 season; AFL and NFC)
- Countries: Canada
- Most recent champion: Calgary Gators
- Most titles: Calgary Wolfpack (4)
- Broadcaster: Local TV stations
- Related competitions: Alberta Football League, Manitoba Football League and Northern Football Conference

The Canadian Major Football League (CMFL) is the national governing body for semi-professional Canadian football (formally known as the Canadian Senior Football League), dedicated to advocating for the promotion of Canadian senior football.

The CMFL was formed in 1999 by the Alberta Football League (AFL) and Manitoba Football League (MFL) in an attempt to crown the amateur national champion of Canada, and replaced the Canadian Senior Intermediate championship game. From 2002 to 2025 the game was played between the AFL and Northern Football Conference (NFC) league champions. The two leagues cooperated but remained legally separate entities.

In 2024 the two leagues reaffirmed the agreement, after several teams split from the NFC and founded the Ontario Power 5 Football League (P5FL). In 2026, following the NFC's collapse, the P5FL reached an agreement to take the NFC's place in the championship.

== Trophy ==
The participating teams compete for the Sid Forster Memorial Trophy, emblematic of the Canadian Major Football Championship. The permanent trophy was provided by the NFC in memory of long-time Sudbury Spartans head coach and Canadian Football Hall of Fame member Sid Forester, who died in 1994. The trophy stays in possession of the game winner for the year following their victory.

== Rules ==
CMFL games are played under the host conference Canadian amateur rules.

When the AFL hosts

- Three downs
- One yard line of restraint
- Cut block rule to include running backs only, within the tackle box, 5 yards deep, on blitzing players though A and B gap, no engaged blitzing player may be cut.

When the NFC hosts

- Four downs
- Zero yard line of restraint
- Cut block rule to include: The Canadian Amateur Rule Book for Tackle Football, which is blocking below the waist is allowed anywhere within the close line play area, which by rule is 2 yards on either side of the line of scrimmage and between the tackles.

== Forster Memorial Trophy games ==
Year	AFL team	Score	NFC team
1999	**Calgary Wolfpack**	36–28	Thunder Bay Storm (MFL)
2000	**Winnipeg Mustangs** (MFL)	14–42	Oakville Longhorns
2001^	**Calgary Thunder**	0–25	Winnipeg Mustangs (MFL)
2001^	Calgary Wolfpack	0–41	**Oakville Longhorns**
2002	**Calgary Wolfpack**	46–54	Oakville Longhorns
2003	Calgary Wolfpack	39–28	**Oakville Longhorns**
2004	**Calgary Wolfpack**	27–40	Milton Marauders
2005	Calgary Wolfpack	20–14	**Tri-City Outlaws**
2006	**Calgary Wolfpack**	29–43	Oshawa Hawkeyes
2007	Edmonton Stallions	10–59	**Sault Ste. Marie Steelers**
2008	**Calgary Wolfpack**	35–7	Tri-City Outlaws
2009	Edmonton Stallions	6–65	**Sault Ste. Marie Steelers**
2010	**Lloydminster Vandals**	0–32	Sault Ste. Marie Steelers
2011	Calgary Wolfpack	14–31	**Tri-City Outlaws**
2012	**Lloydminster Vandals**	25–19	Toronto Titans
2013	Calgary Gators	28–50	**Montreal Transit**
2014	**Calgary Wolfpack**	26–49	Montreal Transit
2015	Calgary Gators	38–39	**GTA All-Stars**
2016	**Fort McMurray Monarchs**	59–45	GTA All-Stars
2017	Calgary Gators	17–18	**GTA All-Stars**
2018	**Fort McMurray Monarchs**	22–17	GTA All-Stars
2019	Calgary Wolfpack	0–28	**GTA All-Stars**
2020	Cancelled due to COVID-19 pandemic in Canada		
2021	Cancelled due to COVID-19 pandemic in Canada		
2022	**Cold Lake Fighter Jets**	35–18	GTA All-Stars
2023	Cold Lake Fighter Jets	7–11	**GTA All-Stars**
2024	**Calgary Gators**	35–0	GTA All-Stars
2025	Calgary Gators	39-1	**GTA All-Stars**

^{*} Home team in bold.
^{^} In 2001 the MFL champion Winnipeg Mustangs beat the AFL champion Calgary Thunder 25–0. The 3rd Place AFL team, the Calgary Wolfpack, travelled to Ontario to play the NFC champion and defending Canadian champion Oakville Longhorns.

== Champions ==
Forster Memorial Trophy appearances
Team	League	Wins	Losses	Total	Last won
**Calgary Wolfpack**	AFL	4	7	11	2008
**GTA All Stars** (Note: Including one game as the Toronto Titans.)	NFC	4	5	9	2023
**Oakville Longhorns**	NFC	3	1	4	2002
**Sault Ste. Marie Steelers**	NFC	3	0	3	2010
Calgary Gators	AFL	3	3	5	2026
**Cold Lake Fighter Jets** (Note: As the Lloydminster Vandals.)	AFL	2	2	4	2022
Montreal Transit	NFC	2	0	2	2014
**Fort McMurray Monarchs**	AFL	2	0	2	2018
Tri-City Outlaws	NFC	1	2	3	2011
Winnipeg Mustangs	MFL	1	1	2	2001
Milton Marauders	NFC	1	0	1	2004
Oshawa Hawkeyes	NFC	1	0	1	2006
Edmonton Stallions	AFL	0	2	2	
Calgary Thunder	AFL	0	1	1	
Thunder Bay Storm	MFL	0	1	1	

^{*} Active franchise in bold.

== See also ==
- Football Canada
- Alberta Football League
- Maritime Football League
- Northern Football Conference
