= Doug McNichol =

Canadian football player

Profile
- Position: Defensive end

Personal information
- Born: March 29, 1930; St. Catharines, Ontario, Canada
- Died: February 15, 2012 (aged 81); Mississauga, Ontario, Canada
- Listed height: 6 ft 4 in (1.93 m)
- Listed weight: 250 lb (113 kg)

Career information
- University: Western Ontario
- CFL draft: 1953: 1st round, 1st overall pick

Career history
- 1953–1960: Montreal Alouettes
- 1961–1963: Toronto Argonauts
- 1967: Bramalea Satellites (ORFU)

Awards and highlights
- 5× CFL East All-Star (1953, 1954, 1955, 1958, 1959)

Douglas Stewart McNichol (March 29, 1930 – February 15, 2012) was a professional Canadian football player with the Canadian Football League's Montreal Alouettes and the Toronto Argonauts. After playing college football at the University of Western Ontario, McNichol was drafted first overall by the Alouettes in the first ever Canadian College Draft in 1953 and spent his entire 11-year CFL career as a defensive lineman. McNichol won East All-Star honours in 1953, 1954, 1955, 1958 and 1959.

He played for the Bramalea Satellites Ontario Rugby Football Union intermediate team in 1967.
