= Dave Mann (gridiron football) =

American gridiron football player (1932–2012)

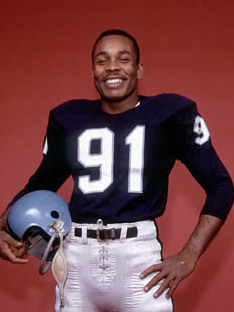
- Mann in 1958

No. 44, 91, 16, 75, 18
- Positions: Punter, Flanker, Running back

Personal information
- Born: June 2, 1932; Berkeley, California, U.S.
- Died: May 22, 2012 (aged 79); Toronto, Ontario, Canada
- Listed height: 6 ft 1 in (1.85 m)
- Listed weight: 190 lb (86 kg)

Career information
- High school: Castlemont (Oakland, California)
- College: Oregon State (1950–1951)
- NFL draft: 1954: 7th round, 74th overall pick

Career history

Playing
- Chicago Cardinals (1955–1957); Toronto Argonauts (1958–1970)

Coaching
- St. Michael's College Offense coach

Awards and highlights
- 2× CFL East All-Star (1960, 1961); All-Time Argo (2005)

Career NFL statistics
- Rushing yards: 544
- Rushing average: 3.5
- Receptions: 37
- Receiving yards: 444
- Total touchdowns: 6
- Stats at Pro Football Reference

Career CFL statistics
- Total yards: 5,030
- Total touchdowns: 33
- Points scored: 435

David Carl Mann (June 2, 1932 – May 22, 2012) was an American professional football halfback and punter in the National Football League (NFL) and Canadian Football League (CFL). Mann was one of the first two black players to play college football for Oregon State College (OSC), helping to break the color barrier there in 1951. Mann also played two seasons in Minor League Baseball.

== Playing career ==
In 1951 Mann was one of two players to break the color barrier on the varsity football team at Oregon State College.

Born in Berkeley, California, Mann played college football at Oregon State College. Mann was one of two black players on the 1951 Oregon State roster — the first in the history of the school.

Due to issues with academic eligibility, Mann left Oregon State and played professional baseball during the 1952 and 1953 seasons for the Oakland Oaks of the Pacific Coast League as a pitcher and outfielder.

In June 1953, Mann turned age 21 and was drafted into the U.S. Army. Stationed at Fort Ord in California, he played on the base football team, which defeated the Quantico Marines Devil Dogs in the December 1953 edition of the Poinsettia Bowl, an armed forces football championship game held several times in the early 1950s; Mann scored two touchdowns against the Marines.

Mann was selected in the seventh round of the 1954 NFL draft by the Chicago Cardinals in the National Football League (NFL). He played for the Cardinals for three seasons as a punter, running back, and a special teams member.

Mann then went to the Canadian Football League (CFL) where he played for the Toronto Argonauts. On the eve of the 1959 season, Mann was arrested after a raid on his apartment discovered about $100 ($1,105 in 2025) worth of marijuana. Although he was acquitted at trial in February 1960, the Argonauts elected not to play him pending the outcome of the trial, forcing Mann to sit out the whole 1959 season. When released in the start of the 1959 season, he played for the Bramalea Satellites, being called back to the Argos as if the Bramalea team were a taxi squad.

Mann played in 12 seasons in the CFL, exclusively for the Argonauts, where he played in 155 regular season games. As a running back and flanker, he had 204 carries for 1,071 yards with seven touchdowns and 204 receptions for 3,025 yards with ten touchdowns. On special teams, Mann was successful on 22 of 51 field goal attempts, 73 of 81 on convert attempts, punted 1,261 times for a 44.2-yard average with 87 singles, had 140 kickoffs for a 56.3-yard average with one single, and had two kick return touchdowns. He shares the CFL record for longest missed field goal return after Boyd Carter returned a kick 15 yards and then lateralled the ball to Mann who returned it another 116 yards for a touchdown in a game against the Montreal Alouettes on August 22, 1958. After leading the league in receptions and receiving yards in 1960 and 1961, Mann was named an East Division All-Star at flanker in both years.

== Coaching career ==
Mann volunteered as offensive coach with St. Michael's College at the University of Toronto, under head coach Lex Byrd. During Mann's tenure, the team won four Mulock Cups as intra-collegiate football champions; including the final playing of intra-faculty tackle football at U of T in the fall of 1993.

== Personal life and death ==
Mann became a Canadian citizen and moved to Mississauga, Ontario, where he instructed techniques in golf, played drums in a jazz trio, and became friends with comedian Bill Cosby. He also became a partner with Archie Alleyne, John Henry Jackson and Howard Matthews in The Underground Railroad, a soul food restaurant in Toronto.

Mann died on May 22, 2012, in a Toronto nursing home due to complications from dementia.
