= Toronto Triumph =

Canadian Lingerie Football League team (2011–12)

Logo

General information
- Founded: 2011
- Folded: 2012
- Stadium: Ricoh Coliseum (2011–12); Hershey Centre (2012)
- Headquartered: Toronto, Ontario; Mississauga, Ontario
- Colours: Oxford blue, Cambridge blue, white
- Website: www.lflcanada.com/torontotriumph/

Personnel
- Owners: Lingerie Football League, LLC
- Head coach: Asst. Coach Kyle Bailey

League / conference affiliations
- Lingerie Football League; LFL Canada; Eastern Conference

The Toronto Triumph was a team in the Lingerie Football League that began play in the 2011–12 season. Based in Toronto, Ontario, they played their inaugural season at the Ricoh Coliseum. When they joined LFL Canada for the 2012 season, they played their home games at the Hershey Centre in Mississauga, Ontario.

The Triumph ceased operations after the 2012 LFL Canada season. The team was historically one of the worst in the league, only winning a single game, and was marred by labour disputes and behavioral issues throughout its existence.

== History ==
The Triumph played the 2011–12 season in the United States Lingerie Football League (LFL) as a preview for the Canadian league that was announced to begin play in 2012. Open try-outs were held at Polson Pier on April 30, 2011. Among those attending was Krista Ford, the 20-year-old daughter of Toronto City Councillor Doug Ford and niece of Toronto mayor Rob Ford; she played touch football in high school. Ford was eventually accepted onto the team, becoming the team's captain.

The inaugural game resulted in a 48–14 loss, with around 1800 in attendance or about 20% of the capacity in Ricoh Coliseum. The half-time show was a contest to tackle one of the players. After the first game, the Triumph released four players. Shortly after, sixteen of the twenty players on the team, including captain Krista Ford, quit the team. They criticized the helmets and shoulder pads provided as unsafe, and suggested that the coaching was improper. Management suggested that "[m]ost of these women have never touched a football prior. Now they're critiquing on who's qualified to coach football. It's almost laughable." Commissioner Mitchell Mortaza accused the players of having a "lack of heart". Ford had previously publicly commented on the growing expenses not covered by the team. The league made no mention of the mass exodus in its official preview of the following week's game, which the Triumph played with ten replacement players in addition to the few remaining players who did not quit.

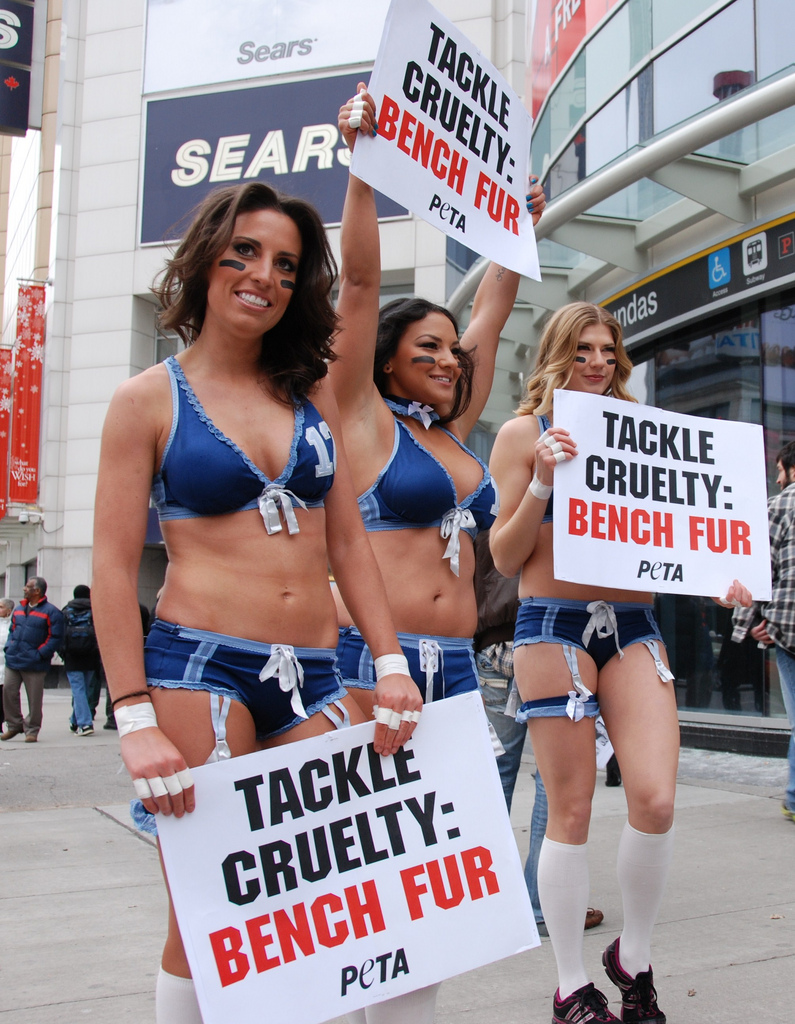
Triumph players during a PETA rally

The replacement players went on to engage in a bench-clearing brawl in a 74–0 shutout loss to the Philadelphia Passion. The team finished in last place in the league for the 2011–12 season and league chairman Mitch Mortaza fired the Triumph coaching staff, citing the coaches' inability to control the players.

The Triumph was one of four teams to be included in the Lingerie Football League's new Canadian division, LFL Canada, along with the BC Angels, Saskatoon Sirens and Regina Rage. Coinciding with the move, the Triumph relocated to the Hershey Centre in Mississauga.

On June 27, 2013, the LFL announced that the Triumph would suspend operations for the 2013 season citing concerns with both the Hershey Centre and the Ricoh Coliseum being inadequate for the league's logistical and broadcast requirements. The 2013 LFL Canada season was then postponed indefinitely due to player disputes, league office scheduling, and general preparation.

== Seasons ==
=== 2011–12 season ===
Win Loss Tie

Date	Opponent	Venue	Score	Record
September 17	Tampa Breeze	Ricoh Coliseum	Lost, 14–48	0–1
October 28	Baltimore Charm	Ricoh Coliseum	Lost, 6–42	0–2
December 9	at Philadelphia Passion	Sun National Bank Center	Lost, 0–74	0–3
January 13	at Orlando Fantasy	Citrus Bowl	Lost, 18–49	0–4

=== 2012 LFL Canada ===
Date	Opponent	Venue	Score	Record
September 8	at Regina Rage	Brandt Centre	Lost, 32–40	0–1
September 15	Saskatoon Sirens	Hershey Centre	Lost, 22–44	0–2
September 29	at BC Angels	Abbotsford Entertainment & Sports Centre	Lost, 27–31	0–3
October 27	BC Angels	Hershey Centre	Won, 22–8	1–3
