= Archie Alleyne =

Canadian jazz musician and autobiographer

Archie Alleyne CM
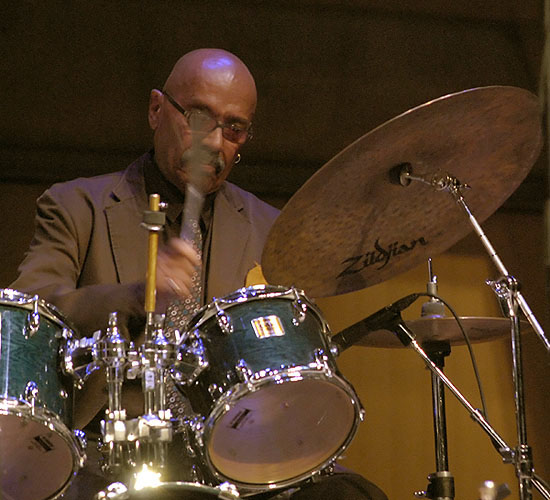

Background information
- Born: January 7, 1933; Toronto, Ontario, Canada
- Died: June 8, 2015 (aged 82)
- Genres: Jazz
- Occupation: Drummer

Archibald Alexander "Archie" Alleyne CM (January 7, 1933 – June 8, 2015) was a Canadian jazz drummer, and advocate for Black musicians and Black rights. Best known as a drummer for influential jazz musicians such as Billie Holiday, Lester Young, Stan Getz, Coleman Hawkins and Ben Webster, he was also prominent as a recording artist on his own and with Canadian jazz musicians such as Oliver Jones, Cy McLean and Brian Browne. He is also known for fighting against systemic racism and discrimination throughout his career and breaking colour barriers throughout the 1940s having appeared in previously "whites only" music clubs in Toronto such as the Town Tavern in the 1940s.

== Personal life and career ==
Born and raised in Toronto, Ontario, Alleyne grew up in Kensington Market which was home to many Jewish families and the city's small Black community. His father worked as a railroad porter with the Pullman Company and his grandmother was a domestic worker. Realizing he did not want to follow his father's footsteps, Alleyne set out to follow his passion of music and his first engagement was as a drummer at a church on the corner of Bathurst and College.

He then started to play with talented white, jazz musicians such as Bill Goddard and Dave Hammer and eventually was introduced to several jazz clubs by Jack McQuade, the co-owner of Canada's largest music store, Long & McQuade. Between gigs, Alleyne would practice at the St. Christopher House and the Universal Negro Improvement Association and African Communities League hall.

Over time his reputation grew and Alleyne eventually became the house drummer at the Town Tavern jazz club between 1955 and 1966. He would also play at the Colonial Tavern which was the first Black-owned club in Toronto. He became the drummer of choice for many visiting artists such as Billie Holiday, Ben Webster, and Lester Young. He became an international artist, touring countries across Africa and the Caribbean.

Following a serious car accident in 1967, Alleyne stepped away from music for a number of years, becoming a partner with Dave Mann, John Henry Jackson and Howard Matthews in The Underground Railroad, a soul food restaurant and first of its kind in Toronto.

After being bought out of the restaurant in 1981, he returned to music in the early 1980s with Oliver Jones' band. During this time he also became an activist whose accomplishment include successfully protesting the exclusion of jazz artists from the Canada Council's funding opportunities and ensuring the representation of Black musicians at the Toronto Jazz Festival.

In 2000, Archie Alleyne and Doug Richardson created the hard-bop jazz band, Kollage. Kollage’s original lineup included Jeff King (saxophone), Chris Butcher (trombone), Alex Brown (trumpet), Stacie McGregor (piano), Artie Roth (bass) and Archie Alleyne (drums). Kollage disbanded in 2014 but reformed in 2015 with Isaiah Gibbons, as the percussionist. In 2001, Alleyne provided mentorship and performance opportunities for young African-Canadians when he created the Evolution of Jazz Ensemble.

He also established the Archie Alleyne Scholarship Fund to provide bursaries to music students in 2003, and co-authored Colour Me Jazz: The Archie Alleyne Story, an autobiography which was published a few months after his death.

== Awards ==
- 2011, Member of the Order of Canada
- 2011, Toronto Musicians’ Association Lifetime Achievement Award
- 2015, Black Business and Professional Association's Harry Jerome Awards, Lifetime Achievement Award
