= John Henry Jackson =

American gridiron football player and restaurateur

John Henry Jackson (1938 - December 11, 2018) was an American-Canadian football player and restaurateur.

== Football career ==
Born in Columbus, Georgia, he played NCAA football for the Indiana Hoosiers before being signed to the Toronto Argonauts of the Canadian Football League in 1960. He played in just one CFL game for the team before being waived in 1961, but remained in Canada as he had begun dating Toronto resident Anna Fitzsimmons, whom he married in 1962. He took a job in advertising sales for the Toronto Telegram, became a Canadian citizen in 1965, and played as a quarterback in the Continental Football League with the Quebec Rifles, later to become the Toronto Rifles.

At a Rifles game against the Wheeling Ironmen in October 1965, Jackson was arrested on the grounds of purportedly failing to report for US Army draft duty in 1961, a time when he was already living in Canada. The owner of the Wheeling team posted his $1,000 bail, with Jackson returning to the stadium for just the final few minutes of the game; despite having missed the game, the Rifles presented him with the winning game ball. The team, the league and the Telegram all supported him in his legal fight, and the charges were eventually dropped in 1966.

He quit the Rifles in August 1966 in a dispute with coach Leo Cahill, but briefly returned to the team in 1967, before being placed on waivers a few months later.

== Restaurant career ==
After leaving football he became a partner with Archie Alleyne, Dave Mann and Howard Matthews in The Underground Railroad, a soul food restaurant in Toronto which launched in 1969.

He was elected president of the Ontario Restaurant and Foodservices Association in 1980; in 1981, he bought out his partners and became the sole owner of the restaurant.

In 1988 the restaurant was forced out of its longtime location on King Street, and reopened in 1989 at a new location near the corner of Church and Front Streets. After the restaurant closed permanently in 1990, he moved on to manage the Meteor restaurant on Peter Street, and continued as manager when Wayne Gretzky partnered with the owners to rebrand it as the Wayne Gretzky's sports bar.

== Later life ==
After retiring from the restaurant business, he worked for a number of years as a justice of the peace in Toronto and Brampton.

He died on December 11, 2018.
