= Saint John Storm =

General information
- Founded: 2004
- Headquartered: Saint John, New Brunswick, Canada
- Colours: Oxford blue, Orange, White

Personnel
- Head coach: Larry Harlow

League / conference affiliations
- Maritime Women's Football League; Maritime

Championships
- MWFL championships: 0; 2010, 2011

The Saint John Storm are a women's Canadian football team in the Maritime Women's Football League. Originally known as the Saint John Seagalls, they were also once known as the Saint John Buccaneers and are one of the three charter franchises in MWFL history. The current head coach is Larry Harlow and the coaching staff includes Jim Mather, Tyler Guimond, Danny Oliver and Gillian Gilmore. Games are contested at Kennebecasis High Field.

== Year by year ==
= Indicates Playoff Appearance

= Indicates Regular Season Title

= Indicates League Championship

Season	Record	Finish	Postseason
2010	5-1-0		SupHer Bowl VII, 26-6 vs. Vipers
2011	5-1-0		SupHer Bowl VIII, 31-8 vs. Gladiators
2012			Friendship Bowl champions
2013	6-0-0	Regular season champions	SupHer Bowl X, 14-26 vs. Gladiators

== IFAF competitors ==
The following recognizes women from the Saint John Storm that competed in the IFAF Women's World Football Championships

=== 2010 ===
- Lori Boyles
- Jaclyn Brewer
- Ashley Clements
- Melissa Daley
- Erin Devlin
- Kara Fillmore
- Lisa Harlow
- Kendra Jones
- Lisa Rogers
- Amy Salter
- Terri Shannon
- Trina Graves
- Alanna Waberski
- Michelle Young-Mather

=== 2013 ===
- Lori Boyles
- Trina Graves

== Awards and honours ==
- 2011 SupHer Bowl VIII Most Outstanding Player Offence, Lisa Harlow
- 2011 SupHer Bowl VIII Most Outstanding Player Defence, Ashlee Clements
- 2010 SupHer Bowl VII Most Outstanding Player Offence, Kendra Jones
- 2010 SupHer Bowl VII Most Outstanding Player Defence, Jaclyn Brewer
- 2009 SupHer Bowl VI Most Outstanding Player Offence, Lori Boyles
- 2009 SupHer Bowl VI Most Outstanding Player Defence, Michele Young-Mather
- 2008 SupHer Bowl V Most Outstanding Player Defence, Alanna Waberski
