= Alberta Football League =

Amateur Canadian football league

- Sport: Canadian football
- Founded: 1984
- President: Vincent Roth
- No. of teams: 6
- Country: Canada
- Most recent champion: Calgary Gators
- Most titles: Calgary Wolfpack (16)
- Website: www.albertafootballleague.ca

The Alberta Football League (AFL) is an amateur Canadian football league. The league's schedule runs from the start of June through to the end of September.

The league currently consists of six teams: Airdrie Irish, Calgary Gators, Calgary Wolfpack, Central Alberta Buccaneers, Cold Lake Fighter Jets, and Peace Country Cowboys.

== History ==
The Alberta Football League was established in 1984 so that men over the age of 21 could continue to play organized competitive football within the province of Alberta. Before the creation of the league, the only way to play competitive football after university or junior was the Canadian Football League. In 1984–85 the league consisted of seven teams. They were: the Calgary Raiders, the Calgary Cowboys, the Calgary Crude, the Red Deer Redskins, the Rocky Warriors, the Hinton Grizzlies, and the Brownfield Bruisers.

In 1999, the AFL became a founding member of the Canadian Senior Football League, which is now known as the Canadian Major Football League. The CMFL is the national governing body for semi-pro Canadian football, that arrange the National Championship game (the Forster Memorial Trophy game). At first, AFL champs played against the winner of the Eastern Conference (the Manitoba Football League), but since 2002 that game has been played against the Northern Football Conference winners (teams from Ontario and Quebec).

== League champions and finalists ==
- 2026: Cold Lake Fighter Jets: 10 – Calgary Gators: 60
- 2025: Peace Country Cowboys: 0 – Calgary Gators: 35
- 2024: Cold Lake Fighter Jets: 15 – Calgary Gators: 38
- 2023: Airdrie Irish: 18 – Cold Lake Fighter Jets: 39
- 2022: Airdrie Irish: 0 – Cold Lake Fighter Jets: 55
- 2021: Central Alberta Buccaneers: 47 – Edmonton Elite: 17
- 2020: Cancelled due to COVID-19 pandemic in Alberta
- 2019: Central Alberta Buccaneers: 26 – Calgary Wolfpack: 30
- 2018: Central Alberta Buccaneers: 7 – Fort McMurray Monarchs: 65
- 2017: Calgary Gators: 32 – Fort McMurray Monarchs: 21
- 2016: Fort McMurray Monarchs: 32 – Central Alberta Buccaneers: 23
- 2015: Fort McMurray Monarchs: 24 – Calgary Gators: 37
- 2014: Calgary Wolfpack: 25 – Calgary Gators: 15
- 2013: St. Albert Stars: 16 – Calgary Gators: 41
- 2012: Lloydminster Vandals: 62 – Calgary Wolfpack: 26
- 2011: Calgary Wolfpack: 38 – Grande Prairie Drillers: 14
- 2010: Lloydminster Vandals: 52 – Calgary Gators: 26
- 2009: Edmonton Stallions: 39 – Calgary Wolfpack: 32
- 2008: Calgary Wolfpack: 43 – Lloydminster Vandals: 21
- 2007: Edmonton Stallions: 21 – Calgary Gators: 16
- 2006: Calgary Wolfpack: 31 – Calgary Gators: 7
- 2005: Calgary Wolfpack: 42 – Edmonton Stallions: 28
- 2004: Calgary Wolfpack: 51 – Edmonton Stallions: 46
- 2003: Calgary Wolfpack: 56 – Calgary Thunder: 35
- 2002: Calgary Wolfpack: 49 – Calgary Gators: 15
- 2001: Calgary Thunder: 16 – Calgary Gators: 14
- 2000: Calgary Wolfpack: 30 – Calgary Thunder: 14
- 1999: Calgary Wolfpack: 17 – Calgary Gators: 2
- 1998: Calgary Gators: – Calgary Wolfpack:
- 1997: Red Deer Sooners: 7 – Edmonton Icemen: 3
- 1996: Calgary Wolfpack: – Red Deer Sooners:
- 1995: Calgary Wolfpack: – Red Deer Sooners:
- 1994: Red Deer Sooners: – Edmonton Seminoles:
- 1993: Red Deer Sooners: – Calgary Wolfpack:
- 1992: Calgary Wolfpack: – Red Deer Sooners:
- 1991: Red Deer Sooners: – Calgary Crude:
- 1990: Calgary Wolfpack: – Calgary Crude:
- 1989: Calgary Wolfpack: – Red Deer Sooners:
- 1988: Calgary Raiders: – Calgary Crude:
- 1987: Calgary Raiders: – Red Deer Redskins:
- 1986: Calgary Raiders: – Calgary Crude:
- 1985: Calgary Raiders: – Calgary Thunder:

== AFL championships by franchise ==
Franchise	Championships	Seasons
Calgary Wolfpack (Note: Active franchise)	16	1989, 1990, 1992, 1995, 1996, 1999, 2000, 2002, 2003, 2004, 2005, 2006, 2008, 2011, 2014, 2019
Calgary Raiders	4	1985, 1986, 1987, 1988
Red Deer Sooners	4	1991, 1993, 1994, 1997
Calgary Gators	7	1998, 2013, 2015, 2017, 2024, 2025, 2026
Edmonton Stallions	2	2007, 2009
Lloydminster Vandals	2	2010, 2012
Fort McMurray Monarchs	2	2016, 2018
Calgary Cowboys	1	1984
Calgary Thunder	1	2001
Cold Lake Fighter Jets	2	2022, 2023
Central Alberta Buccaneers	1	2021

== Current AFL teams ==
Map of AFL teams

Team	City	Established	Forster Memorial Trophies (CMFL championships)	League championships	Last AFL championship
Airdrie Irish	Airdrie	2015	0	0	
Calgary Gators	Calgary	1998	2	6	2025
Calgary Wolfpack	Calgary	1989	4	16	2019
Central Alberta Buccaneers (Note: Previously known as Red Deer Buccaneers.)	Lacombe	2002	0	1	2021
Cold Lake Fighter Jets (Note: Previously known as Lloydminster Vandals.)	Cold Lake	2019	1	2	2023
Peace Country Cowboys	Peace River Country	2019	0	0	-

== Defunct AFL teams ==
- Brownfield Bruisers – (1984–1985)
- Calgary Cowboys – (1984–1988, 1991–1996)
- Calgary Crude – (1984–1992)
- Calgary Gators – (1998–2017)
- Calgary Raiders – (1985–1988)
- Calgary Coyotes – (2001–2003)
- Calgary Razorbacks – (2004–2005)
- Calgary Thunder – (2000–2007)
- Edmonton Raiders – (2016-2017)
- Edmonton Seminoles – (1993–1994)
- Edmonton Garrison Army (2010–2012)
- Edmonton Seahawks – (2006–2009)
- Edmonton Icemen – (1995–2004)
- Edmonton Elite – (2021–2024)
- Edmonton Stallions (2002–2015)
- Fort McMurray Monarchs – (2014-2023)
- Hanna Rams – (1976–1984)
- Hinton Grizzlies – (1984–?)
- Lloydminster Vandals – (2004–2018)
- Medicine Hat Marauders – (2005–2006)
- Okotoks Bearcats – (1995–1997)
- Red Deer Redskins – (1985–1987)
- Red Deer Sooners – (1988–1999)
- Rocky Warriors – (1984–?)
- Rocky Raiders – (1983–1984)
- Wainwright Longhorns – (2005–2007)
- Sherwood Park Renegades – (2009–2011)
- Parkland Predators – (2017–2017)
- St. Albert Stars – (2013–2019)
- Leduc Lightning – (2025)
