= Bill C-22: Canadian Football Act =

Unpassed 1974 Canadian federal bill

Parliament of Canada
- Long title: Bill C-22: An Act respecting Canadian Professional Football
- Bill citation: C-22, House of Commons Bills, 29th Parliament, 2nd Session
- Introduced by: Marc Lalonde
- Status: Not passed

Bill C-22: Canadian Football Act (French: Projet de loi C-22: Loi sur le football canadien) was a bill introduced in the Canadian House of Commons by the Liberal government of Prime Minister Pierre Trudeau in April 1974. Its purpose was to give the Canadian Football League (CFL) a government protected monopoly over professional football in Canada. Although the bill was never enacted into law, the move by the federal government eventually compelled the World Football League's Toronto Northmen to move to the United States as the Memphis Southmen.

Despite the introduction of the bill, Portland Storm owner Robert Harris paid the Detroit Wheels to move their September 2 road game against the Wheels to London, Ontario, which was Harris' hometown, and where he had visions of building a new stadium to host a WFL franchise in time for the 1976 season. The game at Little Stadium attracted only 5,101 announced fans, and no further attempts at WFL expansion into Canada occurred. The spectre of the bill was again raised when John F. Bassett, the owner of the Northmen/Southmen franchise, proposed a United States Football League franchise for Hamilton, Ontario, in 1983.

In 2007, there was speculation that a similar bill would be introduced if the National Football League attempted to expand to Toronto and thus threaten the CFL's existence. Such an act would likely still allow for an NFL team to play in Canada in an NFL preseason game and the CFL's off-season; thus allowing for a Canadian city to host the Super Bowl if the NFL decided to host their premier event in a stadium far from an NFL city.

It is also unlikely that any future bill will be passed to affect American college football, such as the NCAA and NAIA, who have or have had teams based in Canada (Simon Fraser University being the lone NCAA member in Canada) and bowl games hosted in Canadian cities, with no opposition, in part because the CFL draws some of its players from American college teams (and, in the case of bowl games, because their December and January scheduling is well after Canadian university football ends its season).

== Details ==
- Designated C-22.
- Introduced by the Minister of Health, Marc Lalonde.
- Claimed it would protect the Canadian Football League, would allow the CFL to grow and develop its own distinct character
- Of the mayors of the nine CFL cities at the time, only three were against the Canadian Football Act. They were the mayors of Vancouver, Montreal and Toronto, also the biggest cities of Canada then and now, with two of them hosting teams from leagues that played a different code of football. Montreal played host to one of the World League of American Football teams, the Montréal Machine, in the early 1990s after their CFL team folded in the late 1980s. Toronto were hosts to an Arena Football League team for two seasons, the Toronto Phantoms.
- After the bill passed second reading in the House of Commons of Canada, it was given to the Standing Committee on Health, Welfare and Social Affairs, where it effectively died after the Northmen moved to Memphis.
- Clause 6 in the bill stated that no person that owns, operates, or manages a team in a league foreign from the CFL shall play in Canada. Subsection 2 stated that no player or member of the said team shall play in Canada. If the bill had passed and became law, it would effectively kill teams like the Northmen.

These facts were gathered from the actual debates held in the House of Commons from April 10 to April 28, 1974.

== See also ==
- List of football teams in Canada
- Canadian cultural protectionism
- National Football League in Toronto
