= Northern Football Conference =

Semi-pro Canadian football league founded 1954

- Sport: Canadian football
- Founded: 1954
- First season: 1954
- Most recent season: 2024
- No. of teams: 5
- Country: Canada
- Most recent champion: GTA All-Stars (7)
- Most titles: Sudbury Spartans (18)
- Website: Northern Football Conference

The Northern Football Conference (NFC) was a semi-professional Canadian football league with franchises based primarily in Ontario, Canada. The league consists of five teams and runs from May until mid-August. At the time of its closure, it was the oldest running senior amateur football league in Canada.

The league began playing in 1954 (then they were known as Northern Ontario Rugby Football Union) with four teams participating, and has operated continuously with as many as 11 teams since then. The annual league champion is awarded the Plaunt Memorial Trophy, named for Greater Sudbury veteran Donald Plaunt who was killed in action during World War II.

In 2000, the NFC became a founding member of the Canadian Senior Football League, which is now known as the Canadian Major Football League. The CMFL is the national governing body for semi-pro Canadian football. Every September the NFC champion meets the champion of the Alberta Football League to determine the national champion (Sid Forster Memorial Trophy), with the game site alternating each year.

Beginning in 2024, several of the NFC's teams split from the NFC to create the Ontario Power 5 Football League. The remaining NFC teams continued play through the 2024 season but folded shortly afterward, and the Power 5 league took the NFC's place in the Canadian Major Football League in 2026.

== History ==
During the early 1950s Kirkland Lake football players played exhibition games against the Tri-towns (Cobalt, Haileybury, New Liskeard) area, and would later form Youth Club football teams called Kirkland Lake Alouettes and Tri-town Raiders. In 1952 the Sudbury Amateur Football Club was formed (would later change its name to Sudbury Hardrocks) and started participating in those games, while a team from North Bay (North Bay Roughriders) joined in 1953. In 1954 the teams petitioned the Canadian Rugby Union for the privilege of operating a "recognized" league called the "Northern Ontario Rugby-Football Union".

=== 1954 ===
Team	W	L	T	PF	PA	Points
Sudbury Hardrocks	5	1	0	84	23	10
North Bay Roughriders	4	1	1	85	41	9
Kirkland Lake Alouettes	2	3	1	64	69	5
Tri Town Raiders	0	6	0	27	127	0

Championship series (Best of 3):
Sudbury 24 vs. North Bay 7
Sudbury 14 vs. North Bay 14
Sudbury 22 vs. North Bay 6

=== 1955-1963 ===
After the inaugural season, the league struggled to attract local fans, but by the end of the decade the league was embraced by the northern communities. The Sturgeon Falls Bombers joined the league as an expansion team in 1955, while Rouyn-Noranda Fantassins and the North Renfrew Rams joined a year later.

Beginning in 1955 the NORFU champions went on to compete for the Ontario Intermediate championship. The teams from the south region won all nine contests, but the games became very close as the decade wore on. By the end of the Northern Ontario Rugby-Football Union's first decade it established itself as a "major" sport in many northern communities.

The Sudbury Hardrocks captured the Plaunt Memorial Trophy five times, the Sturgeon Falls Bombers captured it on three consecutive occasions and the North Bay Ti-Cats and the North Renfrew Rams captured it once each.

=== 1964-1972 ===
In 1967 the Northern Ontario Rugby-Football Union changed its name to the Northern Football Conference, to coincide with the parent Canadian Rugby Union league which renamed itself the Canadian Football League (CFL).

The number of members in the league remained relatively stable during this period but there was much change among the membership. The Sudbury team renamed itself the Spartans in 1967, while the Kirkland Lake team changed its name to Kougars in 1968 before folding after the 1971 season. Sturgeon Falls Bombers were forced to take a leave of absence following the 1963 season but returned for four more seasons before ultimately folding in 1968. The Rouyn-Noranda club returned for one more season of play in 1965 but ceased operations thereafter. There were a number of new teams entering the league during this period. Val D'Or Jets, from another western Quebec community, entered a team in the league in 1965 and remained until 1970 but took a leave of absence in 1969. Timmins Falcons entered in 1966 and remained until 1971 but took a leave of absence for the 1970 season. The 1972 season saw two new entrants to the Northern Football Conference; Sault Ste. Marie Steelers, which took over the Timmins operation, and Laurentian University, which purchased much of the Kirkland Lake assets and needed a place to compete after leaving Ontario University Athletics. Both commenced operation in 1972.

Sudbury captured five Plaunt Memorial Trophies and North Bay won three. The only other team to win a Conference title during this period was the first year Sault Ste. Marie Steelers in 1972.

The two league champions from the Northern Football Conference and the Ontario Football Conference faced each other on three occasions in the early 1970s. The only title earned by NFC team came in 1972, when Sault Ste. Marie Steelers beat the London Lords 26–7.

=== 1973-1977 ===
Before the 1973, the NFC become the only remaining senior amateur/ semi-pro football league in Canada, and the Bramalea Satellites from the Ontario Football Conference joined the league. Despite that, the league experienced rough times following its twentieth anniversary. With the folding of the Laurentian University team after the 1973 season and the Bramalea Satellites withdrawing to compete at the Ontario junior level after the 1974 season, the Northern Football Conference had declined to three teams for the 1975 season: Sudbury Spartans, North Bay Ti-Cats and Sault Ste. Marie Steelers.

In attempt to encourage new clubs to join the league, the league decided to include more game innovations, including adopting a summer schedule for the 1976 season, playing with four downs rather than the traditional three downs and allowing local University players to compete. The league returned to a four team lineup in 1976, when the Orillia Silver Bombers joined as an expansion team.

The Bramalea Satellites captured back to back crowns in their only two years in the league (1973–1974) and the Sault Ste. Marie Steelers returned to league prominence by capturing back to back championships (1975–1976) as well. Sudbury added its eleventh title when the Spartans captured the championship in 1977.

=== 1978-1991 ===
The league expanded to seven teams In 1978 by adding three new teams, the Etobicoke Argonauts, the Oakville Longhorns and the Stoney Creek Patriots. In 1982 the Stoney Creek Patriots moved to Hamilton and became the Wildcats, while the Brampton Bears joined in 1985. By 1988 the Sault Ste Marie Steelers folded before the start of the season and the league had again declined to three teams (Sudbury Spartans, Oakville Longhorns and Brampton Bears) but the league returned to a four team lineup a year later when the Brampton Bulldogs were added (they moved to North Bay for the 1991 season).

Sudbury captured six more titles, including four in a row (1982–1985), the Stoney Creek Patriots and Oakville Longhorns each captured three titles and the Brampton Bears and the Sault Ste. Marie Steelers each captured one championship.

=== 1992-1999 ===
In the beginning of 1992 the NFC and the Central Ontario Football League decided to merge, as the Toronto Eagles and the Scarborough Crimson Tide, joined the Northern Football Conference and expanding it to six teams. in 1995, the Hamilton Wild Cats, who had competed in the American Football Association replaced the Crimson Tide as the league sixth team. The Brampton Bears withdrew from the league before the 1996 season and were replaced by Sault Ste. Marie Storm, while the North Bay Bulldogs took a leave of absence from the league for the 1996 season and the Hamilton Wild Cats ceased operations after the second week of the season leaving the Northern Football Conference with four teams for the season. The 1997 season saw the league returned to six teams, when Peterborough Packers and North Bay Bulldogs joined.

The Oakville Longhorns have held the Plaunt Memorial Trophy Championship since 1993.

=== 2000-Present ===
In 2000 the NFC joined forces with the Alberta Football League for a National Championship from Canadian Senior Football League (changed to Canadian Major Football League in 2003). The NFC champions, Oakville Longhorns, beat Manitoba Football League's Winnipeg Mustangs 42–14 in the first contest.

After the 2019 season two league players, Graham Kelly and Archelaus Jack turned pro and drafted by The Liga de Fútbol Americano Profesional (LFA) in part of an agreement with the CFL, which placed two players from Canada on the rosters of the Mexican teams.

The league canceled the 2020 and 2021 seasons due to the COVID-19 pandemic.

The league returned to play in 2022, but with a shorter season game schedule with 9 teams. In 2024 former Oakville Longhorns alum Kyle Hergel was chosen in the 2024 CFL draft first round by the Saskatchewan Roughriders and also signed as a free-agent with the New Orleans Saints.

In 2024, 4 teams (Sudbury, Sarnia, Sault Ste Marie & Tri City) left the NFC because of a scheduling issues, and formed a new league under the name Ontario Power 5 Football League. Though the NFC continued play for the 2024 season, online references (such as social media updates) ended following that season. The Power 5 league joined the CMFL in 2026.

== Rules ==
The NFC plays by rules of the Canadian Rule Book for Amateur Football, with the following exceptions:

- Four downs are used instead of three.
- In the regular season, overtime is played to a maximum of two possessions per team.

== Teams ==
Team	City/Town	Established	Plaunte Memorial Trophy (NFC Championships)	Forster Memorial Trophy (CMFL Championships)	Last NFC Championship
GTA All Stars	Etobicoke (Greater Toronto Area)	2001; (Note: Previously known as Megacity Maddogs from 2001–05 and Toronto Maddogs/Titans from 2006-2013.); 2014	7 (Note: Includes one championship as the Toronto Titans.)	3	2023
Oakville Longhorns	Oakville	1978 (Note: Dormant for the 2009 season.)	14	3	2003
Ottawa Sooners (Note: Were known as the Ottawa Invaders until 2018.)	Ottawa	2010	0	0	-
Sarnia Imperials	Sarnia	2006	0	0	-
Sault Steelers (Note: Changed its name from Storm to Steelers in 2003.)	Sault Ste. Marie	1996 (Note: Different team with the same name played in the league between 1972 and 1988.)	3	3	2010
Steel City Patriots (Note: Were known as the Hamilton Steel City Patriots until 2016.)	Scarborough, Toronto	2014	0	0	-
Sudbury Spartans (Note: Changed its name from Hardrocks to Spartans in 1967.)	Greater Sudbury	1952 (Note: Suspended operations between 2007 and 2011.)	18	0	1992
Tri-City Outlaws	Kitchener, Waterloo and Cambridge	2003	3	1	2011
North Bay Bulldogs	North Bay	1989	0	0	-

== Former teams ==
- Belleville Panthers
- Bramalea Satellites
- Brampton Bears
- Brampton Bulldogs
- Deep River Rams
- Durham Hawkeyes
- Etobicoke Argonauts
- Hamilton Wild Cats
- Hamilton Wildcats
- Kingston Privateers
- Kirkland Lake Alouettes
- Kirkland Lake Kougars
- Laurentian University Voyageurs
- Markham Raiders
- Mega City Maddogs
- Milton Marauders
- Mississauga Wolverines
- Montreal Transit
- North Bay Bulldogs
- North Bay Northmen
- North Bay Ti-Cats
- North Renfrew Rams
- Orillia Silver Bombers
- Oshawa Hawkeyes
- Peterborough Packers
- Quinte-Limestone Panthers
- Rouyn-Noranda Fantassins
- Sault Ste. Marie Steelers (1972-88)
- Scarborough Crimson Tide
- Stoney Creek Patriots
- Sturgeon Falls Bombers
- Timmins Falcons
- Toronto Eagles
- Toronto Maddogs
- Toronto Raiders
- Toronto Titans
- Tri Town Miners
- Tri Town Raiders
- Val D’Or Jets

== League champions ==
Year	Champion team	Record	Plaunte Memorial Trophy Game (NFC Championships)	Forster Memorial Trophy Game (CMFL Championships)
2000	Oakville Longhorns	7-1	Oakville Longhorns 38-3 Sault Ste. Marie Steelers	Oakville Longhorns 42-14 Winnipeg Mustangs (MFL)
2001	Oakville Longhorns	8-0	Oakville Longhorns 36-34 Mississauga Wolverines	Oakville Longhorns 41-0 Calgary Wolfpack*
2002	Oakville Longhorns	9-0	Oakville Longhorns 34-6 Mississauga Wolverines	Oakville Longhorns 54-46 Calgary Wolfpack
2003	Oakville Longhorns	8-0	Oakville Longhorns 51-0 Sault Ste. Marie Steelers	Oakville Longhorns 28-39 Calgary Wolfpack
2004	Milton Marauders	5-3	Milton Marauders 35-14 Oakville Longhorns	Milton Marauders 40-27 Calgary Wolfpack
2005	Tri-City Outlaws		Tri-City Outlaws 13-9 Milton Marauders	Tri-City Outlaws 14-20 Calgary Wolfpack
2006	Oshawa Hawkeyes		Oshawa Hawkeyes 20-17 Milton Marauders	Oshawa Hawkeyes 43-29 Calgary Wolfpack
2007	Sault Ste. Marie Steelers	6-2	Sault Ste. Marie Steelers 23-10 Tri-City Outlaws	Sault Ste. Marie Steelers 59-10 Edmonton Stallions
2008	Tri-City Outlaws	7-1	Tri-City Outlaws 21-10 Sault Ste. Marie Steelers	Tri-City Outlaws 7-35 Calgary Wolfpack
2009	Sault Ste. Marie Steelers	7-1	Sault Ste. Marie Steelers 31-18 Tri-City Outlaws	Sault Ste. Marie Steelers 65-0 Edmonton Stallions
2010	Sault Ste. Marie Steelers	7-1	Sault Ste. Marie Steelers 35-4 Tri-City Outlaws	Sault Ste. Marie Steelers 32-0 Lloydminster Vandals
2011	Tri-City Outlaws	6-2	Tri-City Outlaws 12-11 Ottawa Invaders	Tri-City Outlaws 31-14 Calgary Wolfpack
2012	Toronto Titans	8-0	Toronto Titans 52-0 Ottawa Invaders	Toronto Titans 19-25 Lloydminster Vandals
2013	Montreal Transit	7-1	Montreal Transit 24-23 Sault Ste. Marie Steelers	Montreal Transit 50-28 Calgary Gators
2014	Montreal Transit		Montreal Transit 28-5 Sault Ste. Marie Steelers	Montreal Transit 49-26 Calgary Wolfpack
2015	GTA All-Stars		GTA All-Stars 32-22 Ottawa Invaders	GTA All-Stars 39-38 Calgary Gators
2016	GTA All-Stars	8-0	GTA All-Stars 29-21 Sarnia Imperials	GTA All-Stars 45-59 Fort McMurray Monarchs
2017	GTA All-Stars	8-0	GTA All-Stars 50-14 Tri-City Outlaws	GTA All-Stars 18-17 Calgary Gators
2018	GTA All-Stars	11-0	GTA All-Stars 44-7 Sarnia Imperials	GTA All-Stars 17-22 Fort McMurray Monarchs
2019	GTA All-Stars	10-1	GTA All-Stars 18-7 Tri-City Outlaws	GTA All-Stars 11-7 Cold Lake Fighter Jets
2020	Cancelled due to COVID-19 pandemic			
2021	Cancelled due to COVID-19 pandemic			
2022	GTA All-Stars	8-1	GTA All-Stars 35-14 Tri-City Outlaws	GTA All-Stars 18-35 Cold Lake Fighter Jets
2023	GTA All-Stars	8-1	GTA All-Stars 42-21 Steel City Patriots	GTA All-Stars 19-0 Calgary Wolfpack

^{*} In 2001 the MFL champion Winnipeg Mustangs beat the AFL champion Calgary Thunder 25-0. The 3rd Place AFL team, the Calgary Wolfpack, traveled to Ontario to play the NFC champion and defending Canadian champion Oakville Longhorns.

== Hall of Fame ==
The Northern Football Conference "Hall of Fame & Life Members" was established in 1985 to recognize outstanding contributions to the league. The inaugural 1985 class of inductees included:

- Sid Forster (Builder), Sudbury & NFC - Also member of the Canadian Football Hall of Fame (class of 2001).
- James Pestolis (Builder), Sturgeon Falls & NFC
- Ron Preston (Player), Kirkland Lake & NFC
- Larry Avery (Player), North Bay
- John Clifford (Player), Sturgeon Falls
