= Maritime Football League =

Canadian sports competition

- Sport: Canadian football
- Founded: 2001
- First season: 2001
- No. of teams: 7
- Country: Canada
- Most recent champion: Nova Scotia Buccaneers
- Most titles: Saint John Wanderers/Moncton Mustangs (8 times)
- Broadcaster: Rogers TV (occasionally)
- Website: MaritimeFootball.com

The Maritime Football League (MFL) is a men's Canadian football minor league in the Maritime Provinces of Canada. The season runs from April until the end of June. The league consists of former CFL, U Sports, and high school football players.

The MFL plays by a modified version of Canadian football rules, following most Canadian conventions except for the number of downs; the MFL uses four downs, consistent with American play, as opposed to the three downs used elsewhere in Canada. The league does not use overtime unless necessary to decide a playoff bracket.

MFL teams are not eligible for the Foster Memorial Trophy, which is ostensibly the Canadian national senior championship but in practice is limited to the leagues in Ontario and Alberta.

== Teams in 2026 ==
- Moncton Mustangs (Rocky Stone Field, Moncton, NB)
- Saint John Wanderers (Canada Games Stadium, Saint John, NB)
- Nova Scotia Buccaneers (Cole Harbour District High School, Halifax, NS)
- Valley Razors (Usher Miller Field, Quispamsis, NB)
- Halifax Heat (Cole Harbour District High School, Halifax, NS)

== Defunct teams ==
- Capital Area Gladiators
- Fredericton Fleet
- Halifax Shockers
- Island Mariners
- Moncton Marshals
- Saint John Longhorns (Merged with Wanderers)
- Super City Mean Green
- UNBSJ Wolves (Joined AFL)
- Dartmouth Knights
- PEI Privateers (Became the Island Mariners in 2017)
- Southern NB Ducks (Became the Valley Razors in 2022)
- Halifax Harbour Hawks (Dissolved in the 2023 preseason)

== Maritime Bowl Champions ==
- I 2002 Halifax Shockers 21 Saint John Wanderers 19 (Hampton, N.B.)
- II 2003 Saint John Wanderers 50 Halifax Shockers 12 (Halifax, N.S.)
- III 2004 Moncton Marshals 30 Halifax Shockers 3 (Moncton, N.B.)
- IV 2005 Saint John Wanderers 28 Dartmouth Knights 18 (Halifax, N.S.)
- V 2006 Saint John Wanderers 52 Dartmouth Knights 26 (Saint John, N.B.)
- VI 2007 Riverview Mustangs 23 Halifax Shockers 0 (Riverview, N.B.)
- VII 2008 Riverview Mustangs 21 Saint John Wanderers 13 (Riverview, N.B.)
- VIII 2009 Riverview Mustangs 16 Halifax Shockers 7 (Riverview, N.B.)
- IX 2010 Moncton Mustangs 29 Dartmouth Knights 10 (Moncton, N.B.)
- XI 2012 Halifax Shockers 45 Saint John Wanderers 6
- XII 2013 Saint John Wanderers 39 Halifax Shockers 20
- XIII 2014 Saint John Wanderers 48 Capital Area Gladiators 7
- XIV 2015 Saint John Wanderers 36 Halifax Buccaneers 29
- XV 2016 Saint John Wanderers 47 Moncton Mustangs 21
- XVI 2017 Moncton Mustangs 43 Saint John Wanderers 23
- XVII 2018 Saint John Wanderers 42 Moncton Mustangs 23
- XVIII 2019 Moncton Mustangs 34 Saint John Wanderers 27
- XIX 2021 Moncton Mustangs 26 Fredericton Fleet 14
- XX 2022 Moncton Mustangs 54 Saint John Wanderers 20
- XXI 2023 Nova Scotia Buccaneers 29 Moncton Mustangs 28

== Mariner Bowl Champions (Tier 2 Playoff Bowl) ==
- I 2007 Dartmouth Knights 20 Saint John Longhorns 15 (Saint John, N.B.)
- II 2008 Capital Area Gladiators 42 Saint John Longhorns 33 (Saint John, N.B.)
- III 2009 Dartmouth Knights 41 P. E. I. Privateers 14 (Dartmouth, N.S.)
- Ended in 2010.
