= Jim Copeland (Canadian football) =

Canadian football player (1939–2023)

Profile
- Positions: Halfback, Defensive back

Personal information
- Born: January 2, 1939; Windsor, Ontario, Canada
- Died: May 6, 2023 (aged 84); Windsor, Ontario
- Listed height: 5 ft 10 in (1.78 m)
- Listed weight: 180 lb (82 kg)

Career history
- 1960: Montreal Alouettes
- 1961–1964: Saskatchewan Roughriders
- 1965–1968: Toronto Argonauts

James Richard Copeland (January 2, 1939 – May 6, 2023) was a Canadian professional football player who played for the Toronto Argonauts, Montreal Alouettes and Saskatchewan Roughriders. He played college football at the University of Utah.
