= Maritime Women's Football League =

Gridiron football league, founded 2004

The Maritime Women's Football League (MWFL) is a Canadian football league in eastern Canada. It was Canada's first all-female full-contact football competition when it began operating in 2004.

Since it was established, the League has grown from two to four teams. They hail from the three major cities of New Brunswick (Fredericton, Moncton and Saint John) along with a team from Halifax, Nova Scotia. A fifth team, on Prince Edward Island, played in the 2019 MWFL season before the COVID-19 pandemic.

The current MWFL title holders are the Saint John Storm, who won the 2024 championship game 15–6 over the Halifax Xplosion.

== Teams ==
- Fredericton Gladiators – Fredericton, New Brunswick
- Halifax Xplosion – Halifax, Nova Scotia
- Saint John Storm – Saint John, New Brunswick
- Moncton Mayhem – Moncton, New Brunswick
- PEI Island Demons – Prince Edward Island (on hiatus)

== History ==
The league was founded in 2004 as the New Brunswick Women’s Football League, NBWFL. In 2006, it changed to its present name, the MWFL, when Halifax joined the competition.

Football Canada wrote, "With many obstacles to overcome the growth of the league was slow and at times discouraging. New teams needed enough money to buy all new equipment, or share with teams." The Maritime league became part of the Junior Player Development Program of Football Canada.

The 2010 Canadian women's national team, runner-up at the World Championship, contained 18 gridiron players from New Brunswick, of whom 14 were from the Saint John area.

The MWFL marked its tenth season, 2013, by naming an anniversary all-time team of the best players. In 2014, the season schedule was moved forward, earlier in the year, to play its seasons from April to June.

Since the MWFL began, the Western Women's Canadian Football League and Central Canadian Women's Football League have also been established in other regions of the country.

== Modified rules ==
In the MWFL, the playing field is a regulation Canadian football field, 65 yards wide, but offences are permitted four downs (rather than the usual three) to move the ball forward 10 yards. The one-yard neutral zone is the same as in regular Canadian football. Instead of 12 players per side, MWFL teams play with 11 per team according to the league's 2012 rules. As of 2012, the four timed quarters are each 12 minutes long ordinarily, but 15 minutes long in the final two weeks of the regular season. The league's former rules in 2007 stipulated that games were played with 10 players per team, in four quarters of 10 minutes each.

== League champions ==
The league championship is known as the SupHer Bowl, while the championship trophy is known as the Judy Upward Trophy.

Year	Champion
2004	Simmonds Seagals
2005	Saint John Buccaneers
2006	Capital Area Lady Gladiators
2007	Capital Area Lady Gladiators
2008	Saint John Storm
2009	Moncton Vipers
2010	Saint John Storm
2011	Saint John Storm
2012	Moncton Vipers
2013	Capital Area Lady Gladiators
2014	Saint John Storm
2015	Saint John Storm
2016	Saint John Storm
2017	Saint John Storm
2018	Fredericton Nissan Lady Gladiators
2019	Halifax Xplosion
2020	Season cancelled due to the COVID-19 pandemic
2021	Saint John Storm; New Brunswick-only exhibition season due to pandemic border restrictions
2022	Halifax Xplosion & Saint John Storm (co-champions); Championship game tied 10–10 after triple OT
2024	Saint John Storm
