= BC Angels =

Logo

General information
- Founded: 2012
- Ended: 2013
- Stadium: Abbotsford Entertainment & Sports Centre
- Headquartered: Abbotsford, British Columbia, Canada
- Colors: Blue, lime green, white
- Website: www.lflcanada.com/bcangels/

Personnel
- Owners: Lingerie Football League, LLC

League / conference affiliations
- Lingerie Football League; LFL Canada

Championships
- LFL Canada Lingerie Bowl: 1 (2012)

Applicants trying out for the BC Angels were told to don "cute gym wear".

The BC Angels were a women's football team in the Lingerie Football League (LFL) and played in the 2012 LFL Canada season. Based in Abbotsford, British Columbia, (70 kilometres away from Vancouver) the Angels played their home games at the Abbotsford Entertainment & Sports Centre. The Angels won the Lingerie Bowl Canada I, the league championship in the only season it was contested.

== History ==
The Angels were the second team announced as a charter team in LFL Canada following the Toronto Triumph, which had played in the Lingerie Football League in the 2011–12 season. Along with the Regina Rage and Saskatoon Sirens, the LFL Canada commenced play with four teams for its inaugural 2012 season.

Although the initial intention was for Vancouver to host the team, BC Place did not have any weekend dates available in 2012, and Rogers Arena was uninterested. They shared a colour scheme with the Vancouver Canucks, the province's National Hockey League team, instead of the local professional football team, the BC Lions, like most of the other LFL teams.

In March 2012, LFL Canada announced tryout details on their website and made a casting call on Model Mayhem. Tryouts for the BC Angels were held on March 23, 2012, in Richmond, British Columbia. Dress attire for the tryout was "cute gym wear". Forty prospective players from the tryout were to be selected to move on to a mini-camp held in May, from which thirty would be selected for a training camp in June. Twenty players would then be selected for the final roster. Commissioner Mortaza expected "a few hundred, if not maybe a couple thousand, to come out and compete for only 20 coveted spots." Only twenty women showed up for the tryout, from Richmond, Vancouver, Surrey, Port Coquitlam, and Langley.

LFL Canada Lingerie Bowl I was played on November 17, 2012, between the Saskatoon Sirens and the BC Angels in Abbotsford, one week before the Canadian Football League's Grey Cup. The BC Angels won the inaugural championship game 25–12 with Angels' quarterback Mary Ann Hanson as the game's Most Valuable Player.

The Lingerie Football League changed its name to the Legends Football League in January 2013, creating the Legends Football League Canada. A few weeks before the scheduled start of the 2013 season, it was postponed to 2014. The Abbotsford News attributed the cancellation to concerns held by players at the Calgary Fillies and the Saskatoon Sirens over player safety and management competence.

However, the BC Angels were expected to participate in the second Pacific Cup between the Angels and the Seattle Mist scheduled for December 2013. On October 3, it was announced that the Angels would be replaced in the game by the Los Angeles Temptation, citing not enough preparation, although a few players from the Angels joined the Mist team.

The LFL Canada and the BC Angels never returned.
