= Sudbury Spartans =

Canadian amateur gridiron football team

- Founded: 1953
- League: Northern Football Conference
- Team history: Sudbury Hardrocks (1954-67); Sudbury Spartans (1967-present)
- Based in: Greater Sudbury, Ontario, Canada
- Stadium: James Jerome Field (2013-present); Queen's Athletic Field (1954–2013)
- Colours: Dark Blue and Silver
- Owner: Dario Zulich (2017-present)
- Head coach: Kim Labrosse
- Championships: 18
- Website: www.sudburyspartans.ca

The Sudbury Spartans are an amateur gridiron football team based in the city of Greater Sudbury, Ontario. Established in 1952, it is the longest continuously operating sports organization in Sudbury. The Spartans have won more Northern Football Conference Championships (18) than any other team in the league.

== Range ==
The team plays in the Northern Football Conference, which also includes current teams from Hamilton, Oakville, Tri City, North Bay, Sault Ste. Marie, Ottawa, Sarnia, and 2 from Toronto.

== History ==
The Spartans began play in 1954 as Charter Members of the Northern Ontario Rugby-Football Union (predecessor to the NFC) Originally named "Hardrocks" to reflect the Sudbury's predominant mining industry, the moniker was changed to "Spartans" in 1967 by then rookie head coach Sid Forster. Forster, a member of the 1953 team who was inducted in the Canadian Football Hall of Fame in 2001, felt the old name sounded more like a street gang than a football team.

== Suspension of operations ==
Following the death of Forster in 1994, the team struggled to remain competitive. It faced several winless seasons in which it could not finish above .500. During this period, it fielded teams as small as 20 men. On May 14, 2007, the Spartans suspended operations due to an insufficient number of players to safely field a team. The team entered into a two-year "leave of absence" from the NFC and were hoping to return to NFC action by 2010, however there is no indication of a leader ready to take ownership of the organization.

== Rebirth ==
In the Fall of 2010, football had become a major sport in City of Greater Sudbury. It had become the most popular participation sport in local high schools. The Joe Macdonald Youth Football league was flourishing, the high school league bursting at the seams and the Sudbury Gladiators of the Ontario Football Conference had enjoyed a few seasons of success on the gridiron. This resulted in a number of graduated Gladiator players looking to continue playing summer football.

The Sudbury Spartan executive were approached by this group and after challenging the football players in Sudbury to commit to playing summer ball by pre-registering for the 2011 NFC season- an abundance of players answered the call and signed up and paid their team fees to play for the Spartans during the upcoming 2011 NFC season. Having answered the call to commit- Spartan President and former head coach Gord Goddard brought together a new Spartan Team Executive and began the process of re-entry into the NFC as a member club.

The Sudbury Spartans have been welcomed back into the Northern Football Conference. On Saturday November 20, 2010, the member clubs of the NFC gave the Spartans conditional acceptance back into the league. Official approval will come January 22, 2011 at the NFC Annual General Meeting in Ottawa.

== New Era Begins ==
On January 22, 2011, the Sudbury Spartans were granted official and full membership back into the Northern Football Conference.

After a 4-year leave of absence – the Spartans return to the gridiron for the first time since 2006. The 2011 team will feature a number of Spartan legends returning to the gridiron.

The offence will be led by NFC Hall of Famer Dave St Amour, joining St Amour on offence will be returning veterans Brandon Dougan, Al Kawa, Steve Gravel, Walter Wilson, Jordan Cecchetto and Phil Gleason.

The defense will be led by NFC Hall of Famer Junior Labrosse alongside veterans Christian Lorenz, Bruno Rocca, Kyle Henri, Yves Filliatrault and Tommy Dube

Some new players joining the team include former North Bay Bulldog Dustin Crowder, Paul Javor, Brett McKnight, Matt Beaulieu, Alex Balloway and Eric Breau.

The team has signed 42 players for the 2011 Season already and still looking for more.

The 2011 season started with a bang. Sudbury visited its long time southern rivals the Oakville Longhorns and won.

When the Spartans returned to their real home, Queens Field, they took another victory against the Toronto Raiders.

== External links and sources ==
- Official website
- New Owner, Dario Zulich 2017
- Spartans Time-line, cybersudbury.com
- Sidney 'Sid' Forster at the Canadian Football Hall of Fame
- Spartans poised to stage comeback; Recruiting, fundraising to begin this fall for next season. Sudbury Star. August 15, 2007. Accessed August 20, 2007. thesudburystar.com
