= Rogers Forum =

Multi-purpose arena in British Columbia, Canada

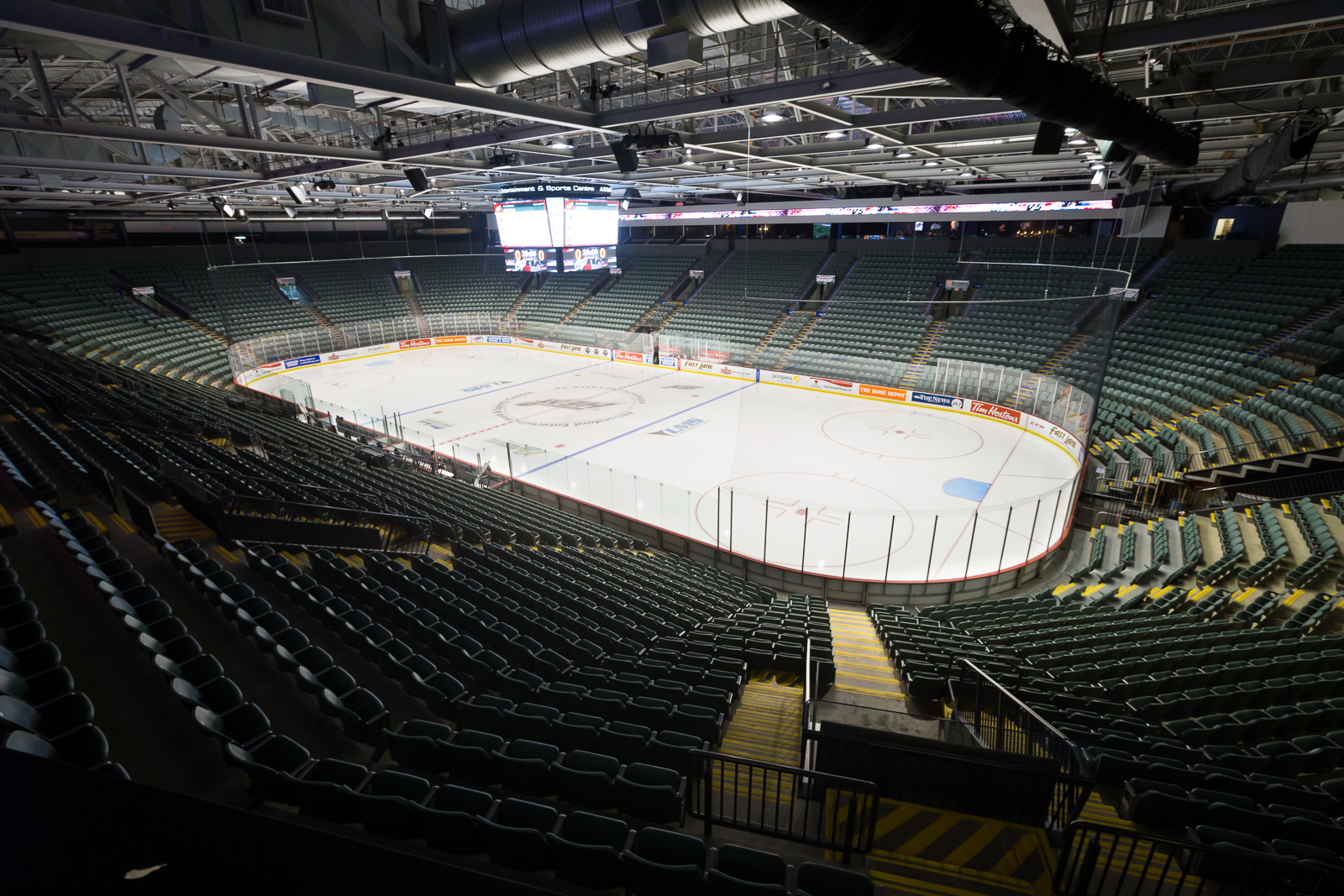
- Rogers Forum, then-Abbotsford Centre in 2013
- Interactive map of Rogers Forum
- Former names: Abbotsford Centre (2009–2025)
- Address: 33800 King Road
- Location: Abbotsford, British Columbia
- Coordinates: 49.030665°N 122.287145°W
- Owner: City of Abbotsford
- Operator: Abbotsford Canucks Limited Partnership
- Capacity: Hockey: 7,000; Basketball: 7,046; Concerts: 8,500

Construction
- Groundbreaking: September 24, 2007
- Opened: May 10, 2009
- Cost: C$66.2 million ($95 million in 2025 dollars)
- Architect: PBK Architects
- Project manager: MHPM Project Managers Inc.
- Structural engineer: Cochrane Engineering
- General contractor: PCL Constructors Westcoast Inc.

Tenants
- Abbotsford Heat (AHL) (2009–2014); BC Angels (LFL Canada) (2012); Fraser Valley Bandits (CEBL) (2019–2021); Abbotsford Canucks (AHL) (2021–present)

Rogers Forum, formerly Abbotsford Centre and Abbotsford Entertainment and Sports Centre, is a 7,000-seat multi-purpose arena in Abbotsford, British Columbia. The arena was expected to cost $64.7 million. Construction began on September 24, 2007. As of 2021, it is the home of the Abbotsford Canucks of the American Hockey League (AHL) after previously hosting AHL's Abbotsford Heat from 2009 to 2014.

== History ==
On September 25, 2006, Abbotsford council voted unanimously to hold a referendum asking voters to borrow $85 million to fund three community projects, including a new entertainment and sports centre. The arena was approved by Abbotsford voters on November 25, 2006, with a 54.8% majority.

With the loss of the Heat, Abbotsford Centre announced it would start a recreational ice hockey league to help fill open dates left at the arena. Each team in the Abbotsford Centre Hockey League is to play 20 games per team during the 2014-15 hockey season.

On May 2, 2018, the Canadian Elite Basketball League announced that the Fraser Valley Bandits would be coming to the Abbotsford Centre in 2019, with the basketball season to be from May to August. The team moved to the Langley Events Centre for the 2022 season.

On May 6, 2021, the Vancouver Canucks were approved to relocate their AHL affiliate to the Abbotsford Centre for the 2021–22 season, where the team became the Abbotsford Canucks.

During 2023, the Abbotsford Centre had arena renovations, including a redesigned videoboard and new fascia ribbon board display, which in comparison to the previous equipment in place since the Abbotsford Centre opened in 2009, are slightly larger. Amenities and new arena seats were also installed within the arena's seating. The brand new videoboard debuted in the AHL for the first time when the Abbotsford Canucks played the Calgary Wranglers at the very same building in Abbotsford, on the 20th of October, losing 3-2.

The arena was renamed Rogers Forum on November 13, 2025.

== Notable Events ==
The Abbotsford Centre hosted games 3, 4, and 5 of the AHL's 2025 Calder Cup Finals on June 17, 19, and 21, 2025, respectively. The Abbotsford Canucks defeated the Charlotte Checkers in games 3 and 4 by scores of 6-1 and 3-2, before losing the potential championship clinching game 5 in overtime by a score of 4-3. The Abbotsford Canucks would go on to win their first AHL championship in franchise history on June 23, 2025, defeating the Checkers 3-2 in game 6 in Charlotte.

== Arena amenities ==
The arena has a capacity of 7,000 seats for hockey with room for expansion to 8,500. There are 300 club seats, 15 boxes, 20 private suites, and 2 party suites.

Inside the Ford Concourse in Abbotsford Centre, there are plenty of concession stands for fans and people to buy food and drinks, one being a Panago pizza slice stand and other various stands. There is also a Canucks Team Store, located at Gate 1 of the building where fans of the Abbotsford Canucks can buy Canucks gear, jerseys, and shirts to support the team. For every home game the Abbotsford Canucks will play, families who have autistic children are able to take a sensory kit for their child so that they can ensure the game will not cause sensory issues within the arena. They are provided by Canucks Autism Network.

During some games when the Abbotsford Canucks play their home games, there will be intermission timeouts to keep fans entertained on the videoboard.
