= Regina Rage =

Canadian women's football team

- Established: 2012
- Folded: 2013
- Based in: Regina, Saskatchewan, Canada
- Home field: Brandt Centre
- Head coach: Ryan Guey
- Owner(s): Lingerie Football League, LLC
- League: Lingerie Football League
- Division: LFL Canada
- Colours: Green, white, black, and silver
- Website: www.lflcanada.com/reginarage/

The Regina Rage were a women's football team in the Lingerie Football League (LFL) and played in the 2012 LFL Canada season. Based in Regina, Saskatchewan, the Rage played its home games at the Brandt Centre.

The Rage were one of four charter teams to play in the LFL Canada, along with the Toronto Triumph (which played in the 2011–12 LFL season), the BC Angels, and Saskatoon Sirens. The Rage's colours are a tribute to Regina's professional football team, the Saskatchewan Roughriders.

The 2013 LFL Canada season was postponed a few weeks prior to the start of the season due to player disputes, league office scheduling, and general lack of team preparation. The LFL Canada never returned.
