= Saskatoon Sirens =

- Established: 2012
- Folded: 2013
- Based in: Saskatoon, Saskatchewan, Canada
- Home field: Credit Union Centre
- Head coach: Chris Lambiris
- Owner(s): Legends Football League, LLC
- League: Lingerie Football League
- Division: LFL Canada
- Colours: Navy blue, royal blue, white
- Website: www.lflcanada.com/saskatoonsirens

The Saskatoon Sirens were a women's football team in the Lingerie Football League (LFL) and played in the 2012 LFL Canada season. Based in Saskatoon, Saskatchewan, the Sirens played their home games at the Credit Union Centre.

The Sirens were one of four teams in the LFL Canada league, after the Toronto Triumph (which played in the main LFL for the 2011–12 season), BC Angels, and the Regina Rage. Because Saskatoon lacks a professional football team of its own, the Sirens' colours were based on those of the Saskatoon Blades, the local team in the Western Hockey League.

The Sirens entered the season ranked last in the league, but the finished first in the league with a 3–1 record and the only team to beat every other team in season play. The Saskatoon Sirens appeared in the first and only LFL Canada Lingerie Bowl, the league's championship game, losing 25–12 to the BC Angels.

The 2013 LFL Canada season was postponed a few weeks prior to the start of the season due to player disputes, league office scheduling, and general lack of team preparation. The LFL Canada never returned.

== Rosters ==
2012 Saskatoon Sirens roster
Quarterbacks: 8 Carrie Britton QB/DL; 19 Anne Erler QB/DB; 15 Heather Furr QB/S; Running backs: 1 Tamar Fennell RB/CB; 4 Casey Simpson RB/LB; Receivers: 6 Ogom Chijindu WR/S; 10 Brenna Maxwell WR/OL; 2 Jaylynne McKeen WR/CB; 9 Sara Mead WR/DB; 16 Amanda Stalwick TE; Offensive linemen: 13 Lindsay Berger OL/DL; 18 Caitlin Clendinneng OL/DL; 7 Candace Friesen C/DL	Defensive linemen: vacant; Linebackers: vacant; Defensive backs: 3 Trista Stoklako S; Roster updated 2012-10-14

2013 Saskatoon Sirens roster
Quarterbacks: 14 Jamie Foskett QB/S; 17 Sarah Pratt QB/S; Running backs: 5 Haylee Erbach RB/LB; 4 Casey Simpson RB/LB; Receivers: 1 Teri Hong WR/CB; 2 Shelby Guillaume WR/S; 3 Alexandra Markova WR/CB; 9 Sara Mead WR/CB; 6 Britni Voshell TE/DE; 8 Carrie Britton TE/DE; 10 Rachel Rosette WR/CB; 11 Courtney Patterson WR/S; 15 Jaylynne McKeen WR/CB; 20 Karrah Stangby TE/DE; Offensive linemen: 13 Lindsay Berger OL/LB; 12 Jenn Neuman C/DE; 7 Candace Friesen C/DL	Defensive linemen: vacant; Linebackers: vacant; Defensive backs Roster updated 2013-09-17
