= Brandt Centre =

Multi-use indoor arena in Regina, Saskatchewan

- The Brandt

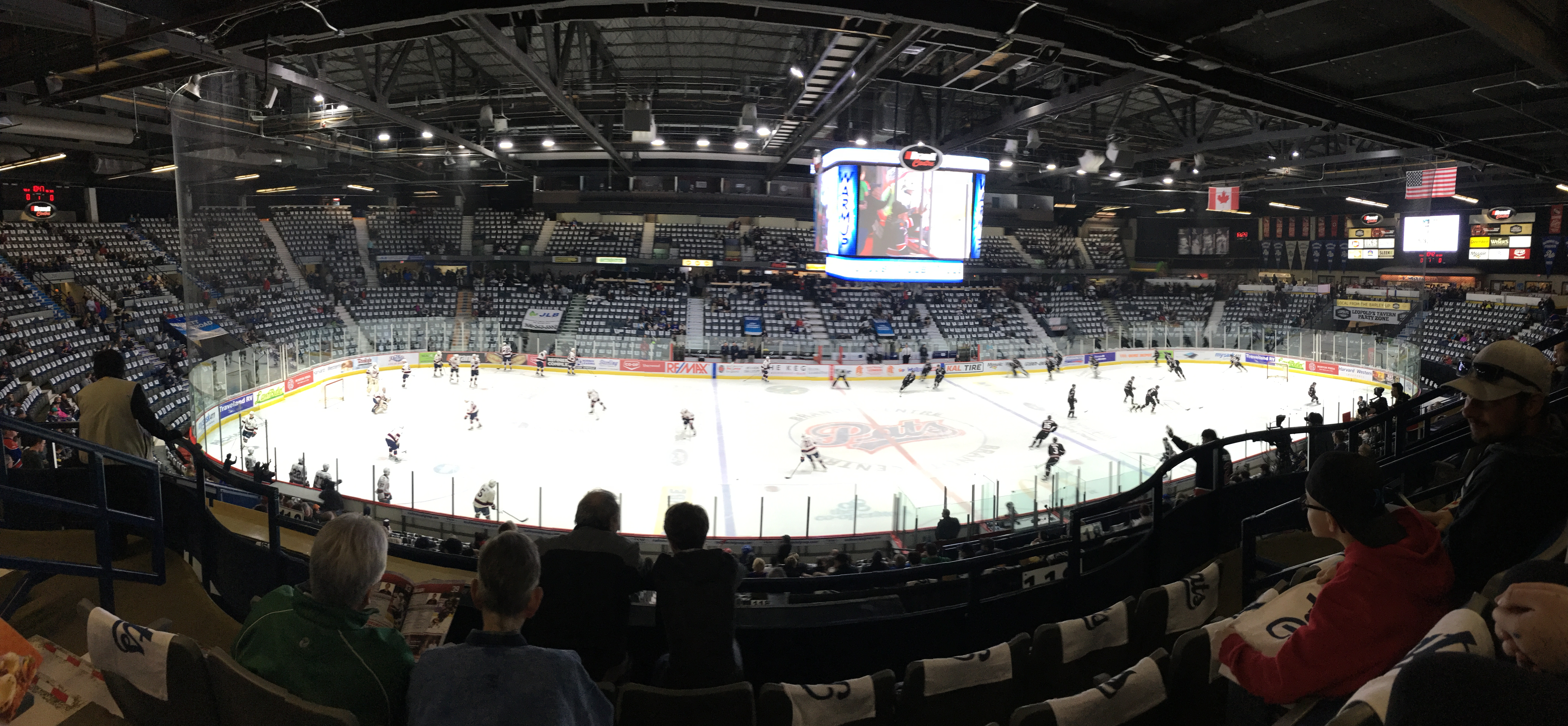

- Location within Saskatchewan Location within Canada
- Former names: Regina Agridome (1977-2005)
- Location: 1700 Elphinstone Street; Regina, SK
- Coordinates: 50°27′1″N 104°38′15″W
- Owner: City of Regina
- Operator: Regina Exhibition Association Ltd.
- Capacity: 6,000
- Executive suites: 35

Construction
- Groundbreaking: 1975
- Built: 1975–1977
- Opened: October 2, 1977
- Renovated: 2007
- Expanded: 2007
- Cost: C$7.7 million ($37.6 million in 2025 dollars)
- Architect: Phillips Barrat
- General contractor: Warren Cochrane

Tenants
- Regina Pats (WHL) (1977–present); Regina Rage (LFL Canada) (2012)

Website
- https://www.realdistrict.ca/venues/brandt-centre/

Brandt Centre (formerly the Regina Agridome) is an indoor arena at REAL District in Regina, Saskatchewan. Built in 1977, it is the home arena for the WHL's Regina Pats. It is owned by the city of Regina and operated by the Regina Exhibition Association Ltd. (REAL).

== History ==
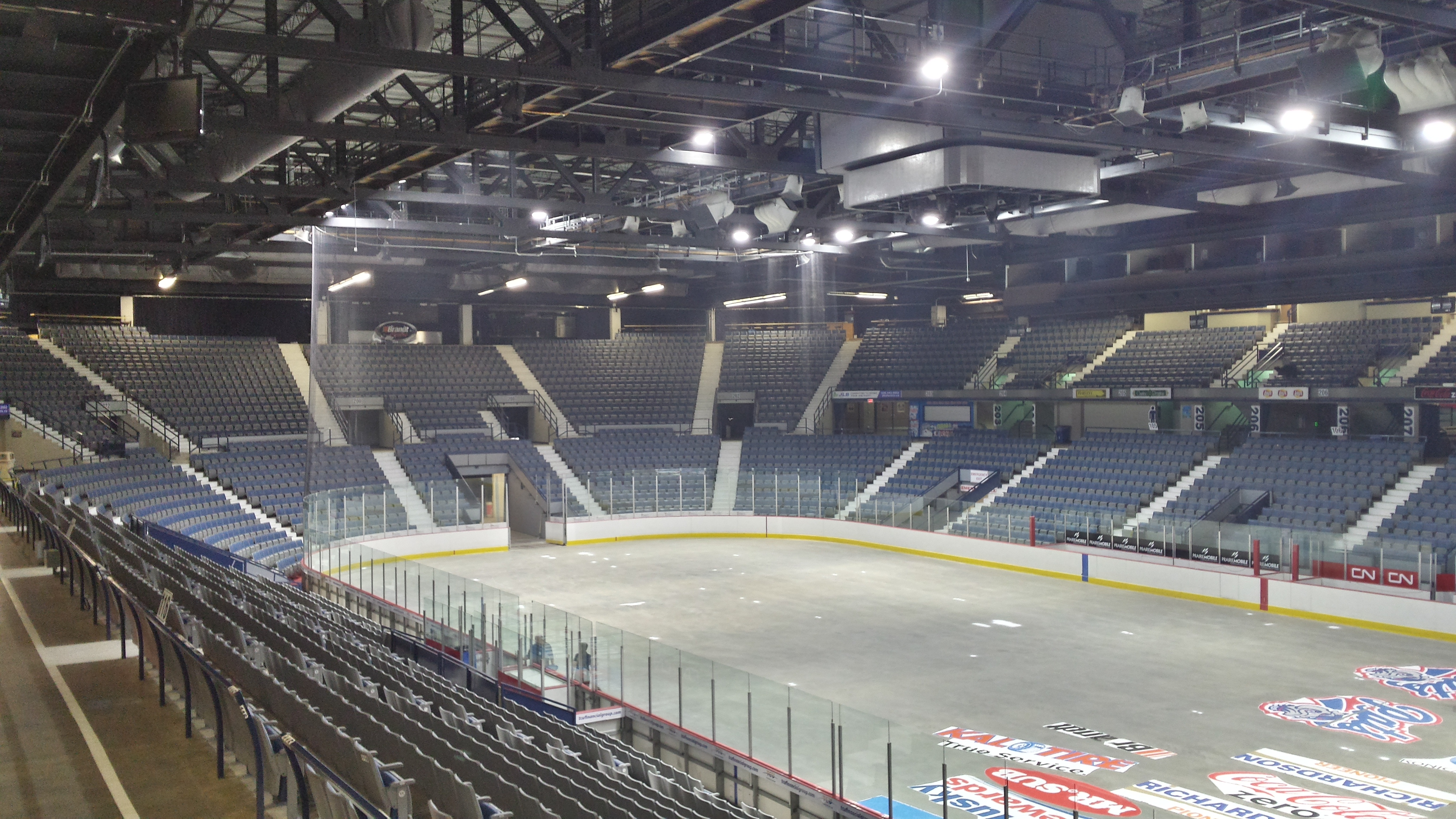
The Brandt Centre before hockey season.

The venue has hosted various sporting events, including curling and hockey events, as well as concerts and other events. Beginning in 2012, it was home to the Regina Rage of the Legends Football League's Canadian division. Opened in 1977 as the Agridome, it was renamed Brandt Centre after the city sold naming rights to Regina-based farm equipment manufacturer Brandt Group.

In January 2015, the arena introduced a new scoreboard with ten video displays. Costing over $3 million, it is the largest suspended scoreboard in the province. The arena underwent renovations in preparation for the 2018 Memorial Cup, including improvements to its boards, dressing rooms, and lighting. The city contributed $1 million in funding towards these upgrades.

== Major events ==
Brandt Centre has hosted multiple Memorial Cup tournaments, including the 1980 (co-hosted with Brandon, Manitoba), 2001, and 2018 editions. It co-hosted the 2010 World Junior Ice Hockey Championships with SaskTel Centre in Saskatoon.

It has hosted multiple Scotties Tournament of Hearts and Montana's Brier curling tournaments, most recently hosting them in 2008 and 2024 respectively.

In 2017, Brandt Centre hosted the Skate Canada International.

In March 2023, All Elite Wrestling (AEW) broadcast Collision from Brandt Centre, marking the promotion's first-ever televised event in Saskatchewan.

=== Concerts ===
The arena hosted the 2013 Juno Awards.
