= List of Suncorp Super Netball venues =

The following list includes all arenas in use by a Suncorp Super Netball team as of the 2025 Suncorp Super Netball season. Information included in this list are arena locations, seating capacities, years opened and time in use.

== Current arenas ==
Image	Arena	Location	Team(s)	Capacity	Opened	Ref(s)
	Adelaide Entertainment Centre*	Adelaide, South Australia	Adelaide Thunderbirds	11,300	1991	
	AIS Arena*	Canberra, Australian Capital Territory	Giants Netball	5,000	2019	
	Ken Rosewall Arena	Sydney, New South Wales	Giants Netball; New South Wales Swifts	10,500	2000	
	Margaret Court Arena*	Melbourne, Victoria	Melbourne Vixens	7,500	2014	
	John Cain Arena	Melbourne, Victoria	Melbourne Mavericks; Melbourne Vixens	10,500	2000	
	Nissan Arena	Brisbane, Queensland	Queensland Firebirds	5,000	2019	
	Netball SA Stadium	Adelaide, South Australia	Adelaide Thunderbirds	3,200	2001	
	RAC Arena	Perth, Western Australia	West Coast Fever	15,500	2012	
	MyState Bank Arena*	Hobart, Tasmania	Melbourne Mavericks	4,340	1989	
	State Netball and Hockey Centre*	Melbourne, Victoria	Melbourne Vixens	3,050	2001	
	USC Stadium	Sunshine Coast, Queensland	Sunshine Coast Lightning	3,000	2017	

* Alternate venue used by the team listed.

== See also ==
- List of A-League stadiums
- List of Australian Football League grounds
- List of Australian cricket grounds
- List of ice rinks in Australia
- List of indoor arenas in Australia
- List of National Basketball League (Australia) venues
- List of National Rugby League stadiums
- List of Australian rugby league stadiums
- List of Australian rugby union stadiums
- List of soccer stadiums in Australia
- List of Oceanian stadiums by capacity
- Netball in Australia
- Netball Australia
