= List of sports venues in Australia =

The following is a list of sports venues in Australia.

== National league stadiums ==
Venues for Australian rules football, cricket, rugby league, rugby union and soccer are listed here, if they are a regular venue of:

- An Australian national team (Australia national cricket team, Australia national rugby league team, Australia national rugby union team, Australia national soccer team)
- A club playing at an international level (Super Rugby)
- A club playing at the highest domestic level of a major Australian sport (Australian Football League, AFL women's, National Rugby League, A-League, NRLW, W-League, domestic cricket, Big Bash League). Also included are venues of the Australian Baseball League.

An asterisk indicates that the tenant does not use the venue as their primary home venue.

Image	Stadium	Capacity	City	State	Home team(s)	Shape
	Melbourne Cricket Ground	100,024	Melbourne	Victoria	Australian rules football: Collingwood, Hawthorn, Melbourne, Carlton, Essendon*, Richmond; Cricket: Australia, Victoria, Melbourne Stars; Soccer: Australia*; Rugby league: New South Wales*, Queensland*	Oval
	Stadium Australia (Accor Stadium)	83,500	Sydney	New South Wales	Rugby league: Australia, New South Wales, Canterbury Bulldogs, South Sydney Rabbitohs, Wests Tigers; Rugby union: Australia, New South Wales Waratahs*; Soccer: Australia, Western Sydney Wanderers*	Convertible
	Perth Stadium (Optus Stadium)	61,266	Perth	Western Australia	Australian rules football: West Coast Eagles, Fremantle Dockers; Cricket: Australia, Western Australia, Perth Scorchers	Oval
	Adelaide Oval	53,583	Adelaide	South Australia	Australian rules football: Adelaide, Port Adelaide; Cricket: Australia, South Australia, Adelaide Strikers; Soccer: Adelaide United*	Oval
	Docklands Stadium (Marvel Stadium)	56,347	Melbourne	Victoria	Australian rules football: Carlton*, Essendon, North Melbourne, St Kilda, Western Bulldogs; Cricket: Melbourne Renegades; Rugby league Melbourne Storm*; Rugby union: Australia; Soccer: Australia, Melbourne Victory*	Oval
	Lang Park (Suncorp Stadium)	52,500	Brisbane	Queensland	Rugby league: Australia, Queensland, Brisbane Broncos; Rugby union: Australia, Queensland Reds; Soccer: Australia*, Brisbane Roar	Rectangular
	QSAC Stadium	48,500	Brisbane	Queensland	Soccer: Brisbane Roar FC (women)	Oval
	Sydney Cricket Ground	48,000	Sydney	New South Wales	Australian rules football: Sydney Swans; Cricket: Australia, New South Wales, Sydney Sixers	Oval
	Sydney Football Stadium (Allianz Stadium)	45,000	Sydney	New South Wales	Rugby League: Sydney Roosters; Rugby Union: NSW Waratahs; Soccer: Sydney FC	Rectangular
	Brisbane Cricket Ground	42,000	Brisbane	Queensland	Australian rules football: Brisbane Lions; Cricket: Australia, Queensland, Brisbane Heat	Oval
	Kardinia Park (GMHBA Stadium)	40,000	Geelong	Victoria	Australian rules football: Geelong; Soccer: Melbourne Victory*; Cricket: Victoria*, Australia*	Oval
	Newcastle International Sports Centre (McDonald Jones Stadium)	33,000	Newcastle	New South Wales	Rugby league: Newcastle Knights; Soccer: Newcastle Jets	Rectangular
	Melbourne Rectangular Stadium (AAMI Park)	30,050	Melbourne	Victoria	Rugby league: Australia, Melbourne Storm; Rugby union: Melbourne Rebels, Melbourne Rising; Soccer: Australia, Melbourne City, Melbourne Victory	Rectangular
	Western Sydney Stadium (CommBank Stadium)	30,000	Sydney	New South Wales	Rugby league: Australia, Parramatta Eels, Wests Tigers, Canterbury Bulldogs; Rugby union: New South Wales Waratahs*, Australia; Soccer: Australia, Western Sydney Wanderers*	Rectangular
	Robina Stadium (Cbus Super Stadium)	27,400	Gold Coast	Queensland	Rugby league: Gold Coast Titans	Rectangular
	Brisbane Exhibition Ground	25,490	Brisbane	Queensland	Australian Baseball League: Brisbane Bandits	Oval
	Canberra Stadium (GIO Stadium Canberra)	25,011	Canberra	Australian Capital Territory	Rugby league: Canberra Raiders; Rugby union: Brumbies	Rectangular
	North Queensland Stadium (Queensland Country Bank Stadium)	25,000	Townsville	Queensland	Rugby league: North Queensland Cowboys	Rectangular
	Princes Park (Ikon Park)	24,568	Melbourne	Victoria	AFLW: Carlton	Oval
	Carrara Stadium (People First Stadium)	24,526	Gold Coast	Queensland	Australian rules football: Gold Coast Suns	Oval
	Sydney Showground Stadium (ENGIE Stadium)	24,000	Sydney	New South Wales	Australian rules football: GWS; Cricket: Sydney Thunder; Soccer: Western Sydney Wanderers*	Oval
	Wollongong Showground (WIN Stadium)	23,000	Wollongong	New South Wales	Rugby league: St George Illawarra Dragons	Rectangular
	Brookvale Oval (4 Pines Park)	23,000	Sydney	New South Wales	Rugby league: Manly-Warringah Sea Eagles; Rugby union: New South Wales Waratahs*	Rectangular
	Penrith Stadium (Helloworld Stadium)	22,500	Sydney	New South Wales	Rugby league: Penrith Panthers	Rectangular
	Norwood Oval (Coopers Stadium)	22,000	Adelaide	South Australia	AFLW: Adelaide Crows; Australian Baseball League: Adelaide Bite	Oval
	Endeavour Field (Ocean Protect Stadium)	22,000	Sydney	New South Wales	Rugby league: Cronulla-Sutherland Sharks	Rectangular
	York Park (University of Tasmania Stadium)	21,000	Launceston	Tasmania	Australian rules football: Hawthorn*	Oval
	Jubilee Oval	20,500	Sydney	New South Wales	Rugby league: St George Illawarra Dragons	Rectangular
	Perth Rectangular Stadium (HBF Park)	20,500	Perth	Western Australia	Rugby union: Western Force; Rugby League:Perth Bears; Soccer: Perth Glory	Rectangular
	Central Coast Stadium (Polytec Stadium)	20,059	Central Coast	New South Wales	Soccer: Central Coast; Rugby league: Sydney Roosters*, South Sydney Rabbitohs*	Rectangular
	Campbelltown Stadium	20,000	Sydney	New South Wales	Rugby league: Wests Tigers; Soccer:Western Sydney Wanderers	Rectangular
	WACA	20,000	Perth	Western Australia	Cricket: Australia, Western Australia, Perth Scorchers	Oval
	Leichhardt Oval	20,000	Sydney	New South Wales	Rugby league: Wests Tigers	Rectangular
	Lavington Sports Ground	20,000	Albury	New South Wales	Cricket: Sydney Thunder*; Rugby league: Manly Sea Eagles*; Australian rules football: Lavington Panthers; Soccer: Murray United	Oval
	Bellerive Oval (Ninja Stadium)	19,500	Hobart	Tasmania	Australian rules football: North Melbourne*, Clarence; Cricket: Australia*, Tasmania, Hobart Hurricanes, Prime Minister's XI	Oval
	North Hobart Oval	18,000	Hobart	Tasmania	Rugby league Melbourne Storm*	Convertible
	Barlow Park	18,000	Cairns	Queensland	Rugby league South Sydney Rabbitohs*	Rectangular
	Ballymore Stadium	18,000	Brisbane	Queensland	Rugby union: Queensland Reds*	Rectangular
	Fremantle Oval	17,500	Perth	Western Australia	AFLW: Fremantle Dockers	Oval
	Hindmarsh Stadium	16,500	Adelaide	South Australia	Soccer: Adelaide United	Rectangular
	North Sydney Oval	16,000	Sydney	New South Wales	Cricket: New South Wales Blues*; Rugby league: North Sydney Bears	Oval
	Marrara Oval	14,000	Darwin	Northern Territory	Cricket: Australia*; Australian rules football: Melbourne*; Rugby league: Parramatta Eels*	Oval
	Manuka Oval	13,550	Canberra	Australian Capital Territory	Australian rules football: GWS*; Cricket: Australia*, Prime Minister's XI	Oval
	Cazaly's Stadium	12,000	Cairns	Queensland	Australian rules football: Western Bulldogs*	Oval
	Lakeside Stadium	12,000	Melbourne	Victoria	Athletics: Athletics Australia; Soccer: South Melbourne	Rectangular, with Athletics track
	Casey Fields	12,000	Melbourne	Victoria	AFLW: Melbourne Demons	Oval
	Whitten Oval	12,000	Melbourne	Victoria	AFLW: Western Bulldogs	Oval
	Dolphin Stadium	12,000	Brisbane	Queensland	Rugby league: Redcliffe Dolphins	Rectangular
	Sunshine Coast Stadium	12,000	Sunshine Coast	Queensland	Soccer: Sunshine Coast FC; Rugby league: Sunshine Coast Falcons, Melbourne Storm*; Rugby union: Sunshine Coast Rugby Union, Queensland Country	Rectangular
	Eureka Stadium	11,000	Ballarat	Victoria	Australian rules football: North Ballarat Football Club.	Oval
	Traeger Park	10,000	Alice Springs	Northern Territory	Australian rules football: Melbourne; Cricket: Hobart Hurricanes	Oval
	Queen Elizabeth Oval	10,000	Bendigo	Victoria	Australian rules football: Essendon*	Oval
	Morshead Park	8,500	Ballarat	Victoria	Soccer: Ballarat Red Devils.	Rectangular
	Wade Park	8,000	Orange	New South Wales	Rugby union : New South Wales Country Eagles; Soccer : Central Coast Mariners*	Oval
	Browne Park	5,000	Rockhampton	Queensland	Rugby league: Central Queensland Capras	Rectangular
	Drummoyne Oval	5,000	Sydney	New South Wales	Australian rules football: Greater Western Sydney Giants (AFLW); Cricket: Cricket Australia XI*, New South Wales Blues*, Sydney Sixers (WBBL)*	Oval
	Karen Rolton Oval	5,000	Adelaide	South Australia	Cricket: South Australia*, Southern Stars*	Oval
	Allan Border Field	4,500	Brisbane	Queensland	Cricket: Cricket Australia XI, Queensland Bulls*, Queensland Fire, Southern Stars*	Oval
	Dorrien Gardens	4,000	Perth	Western Australia	Soccer: Perth Glory (W-League)	Rectangular
	Baseball Park	4,000	Perth	Western Australia	Australian Baseball League: Perth Heat	Diamond
	Melbourne Ballpark	3,900	Melbourne	Victoria	Australian Baseball League: Melbourne Aces	Diamond
	McKellar Park	3,500	Canberra	Australian Capital Territory	Soccer: Canberra United FC	Rectangular
	Olympic Park Oval	3,000	Melbourne	Victoria	AFLW: Collingwood	Oval
	South Pine Sports Complex	3,000	Brisbane	Queensland	AFLW: Brisbane Lions	Oval
	Blacktown Baseball Stadium	3,000	Sydney	New South Wales	Australian Baseball League: Sydney Blue Sox	Diamond
	Narrabundah Ballpark	2,250	Canberra	Australian Capital Territory	Australian Baseball League: Canberra Cavalry	Diamond
	Hurstville Oval	1,000	Sydney	New South Wales	Cricket: Cricket Australia XI, New South Wales*, Southern Stars*	Oval
	Holloway Field	1,000	Brisbane	Queensland	Australian Baseball League: Brisbane Bandits*	Diamond

=== Future national league stadiums and major redevelopments ===
Stadium	Capacity	City/Town	State	Home team(s)	Shape	Completion
Brisbane Olympic stadium	63,000	Brisbane	Queensland	2032 Olympics Australian rules football: Brisbane Lions; Cricket: Australia Men's, Brisbane Heat Men's, Brisbane Heat Women's, Queensland Bulls	Oval	By 2032 Olympics
Wyndham City Stadium	15,000	Tarneit	Victoria	Soccer: Western United	Rectangular	2026
Mildura South Regional Sporting Precinct	15,000	Mildura	Victoria	Australian rules football Cricket, Basketball, Netball	Rectangular	2021
Eureka Stadium redevelopment	13,000–15,000	Ballarat	Victoria	Australian rules football: Western Bulldogs	Oval	2021
The Reserve, Springfield	10,000	Springfield	Queensland	Australian rules football: Brisbane Lions AFLW	Oval	2021
New Canberra Stadium	30,000 (upgradable to 45,000)	Canberra	ACT	Rugby league: Canberra Raiders; Rugby union: Brumbies	Rectangular	Before 2030
CQ Stadium	20,000+	Rockhampton	Queensland	Rugby league: Proposed Central Queensland NRL bid	Rectangular	Undetermined
WACA redevelopment	10,000+	Perth	Western Australia	Australian rules football: WAFL; Cricket: Western Australia	Oval	2021/22
Gabba redevelopment	50,000	Brisbane	Queensland	2032 Olympics	Convertible	By 2032 Olympics
Brisbane Live	15,000	Brisbane	Queensland	2032 Olympics	Convertible	By 2032 Olympics
Brisbane Indoor Sports Centre	12,000	Brisbane	Queensland	2032 Olympics	Convertible	By 2032 Olympics
Macquarie Point Stadium	23,000	Hobart	Tasmania	Australian rules football: Tasmania Football Club Cricket: Australia Men's, Australia Women's, Hobart Hurricanes Men's, Hobart Hurricanes Women's Soccer: A-League Men, A-League Women, Socceroos, Matildas Rugby League: NRL, NRLW, State Of Origin Rugby Union: Super Rugby Pacific, Super Rugby Women's, Wallabies, Wallaroos	Oval	2031

== Indoor venues ==
Venues for Basketball (men's and women's), Ice Hockey and Netball are listed here, if they are a regular venue for:

- An Australian national team (Australia national basketball team, Australia men's national ice hockey team, Australia national netball team)
- A club playing at the highest domestic level of the sport (National Basketball League (NBL), Women's National Basketball League (WNBL), Australian Ice Hockey League, Super Netball)

Retractable roof arenas included.

An asterisk indicates that the tenant does not use the venue as their primary home venue.

Image	Stadium	Capacity	City	State	Home team(s)
	Qudos Bank Arena	21,032	Sydney	New South Wales	Basketball: Sydney Kings; Netball: New South Wales Swifts*
	Rod Laver Arena	16,200	Melbourne	Victoria	Tennis: Australian Open
	Perth Arena	14,846	Perth	Western Australia	Basketball: Perth Wildcats; Netball: West Coast Fever; Tennis: Hopman Cup, ATP Cup
	Brisbane Entertainment Centre	13,601	Brisbane	Queensland	Basketball: Brisbane Bullets*
	Adelaide Entertainment Centre	12,000	Adelaide	South Australia	Netball: Australia Netball Diamonds*
	John Cain Arena	10,500	Melbourne	Victoria	Basketball: Melbourne United; Netball: Melbourne Vixens; Tennis: Australian Open
	Ken Rosewell Arena	10,500	Sydney	New South Wales	Tennis: Sydney International, ATP Cup
	Derwent Entertainment Centre	8,600	Hobart	Tasmania	Basketball: Tasmania JackJumpers; Basketball: Tasmania Jewels; Netball: Melbourne Mavericks
	Titanium Security Arena	8,000	Adelaide	South Australia	Basketball: Adelaide 36ers Basketball: Adelaide Lightning; Netball: Adelaide Thunderbirds*
	Margaret Court Arena	7,500	Melbourne	Victoria	Netball: Melbourne Vixens*; Tennis: Australian Open
	Pat Rafter Arena	7,000	Brisbane	Queensland	Tennis: Brisbane International, ATP Cup
	Icehouse	6,500	Melbourne	Victoria	Ice Hockey: Melbourne Ice; Ice Hockey: Melbourne Mustangs
	WIN Entertainment Centre	6,000	Wollongong	New South Wales	Basketball: Illawarra Hawks
	Gold Coast Convention and Exhibition Centre	6,000	Gold Coast	Queensland	Netball: Queensland Firebirds*
	Cairns Convention Centre	5,300	Cairns	Queensland	Basketball: Cairns Taipans
	AIS Arena	5,200	Canberra	Australian Capital Territory	Basketball: Canberra Capitals*
	State Sports Centre	5,006	Sydney	New South Wales	Netball: New South Wales Swifts
	Queensland State Netball Centre	5,000	Brisbane	Queensland	Netball: Queensland Firebirds Basketball: Brisbane Bullets
	HBF Stadium	4,500	Perth	Western Australia	Netball: West Coast Fever*
	Brisbane Convention & Exhibition Centre	4,000	Brisbane	Queensland	Basketball: Brisbane Bullets; Netball: Queensland Firebirds
	Melbourne Sports Centre – Parkville	Basketball: 3,500 Field Hockey: 8,000	Melbourne	Victoria	Basketball: Melbourne United* Field Hockey: HC Melbourne
	Priceline Stadium	3,200	Adelaide	South Australia	Netball: Adelaide Thunderbirds
	State Basketball Centre	3,200	Melbourne	Victoria	Basketball: Melbourne Boomers
	Townsville RSL Stadium	2,500	Annandale	Queensland	Basketball: Townsville Fire
	Dandenong Basketball Stadium	2,200	Dandenong	Victoria	Basketball: Dandenong Rangers
	Central Queensland University	2,000+	Rockhampton	Queensland	Netball: Capricorn Claws
	Bendigo Stadium	2,000+	Bendigo	Victoria	Basketball: Bendigo Spirit
	Geelong Arena	2,000+	Geelong	Victoria	Basketball: Geelong Supercats
	Southern Cross Stadium	2,000	Canberra	Australian Capital Territory	Basketball: Canberra Capitals
	Bendat Basketball Centre	2,000	Perth	Western Australia	Basketball: West Coast Waves
	IceArenA	2,000	Adelaide	South Australia	Ice hockey: Adelaide Adrenaline
	Lauren Jackson Sports Centre	1,100	Albury	New South Wales	Basketball: Albury Wodonga Bandits
	University of Sydney	1,000	Sydney	New South Wales	Basketball: Sydney Uni Flames
	Phillip Ice Skating Centre	1,000	Canberra	Australian Capital Territory	Ice Hockey: CBR Brave

== See also ==
- List of Australian Football League grounds
- List of Australian cricket grounds
- List of ice rinks in Australia
- List of National Basketball League (Australia) venues
- List of Australian rugby league stadiums
- List of Australian rugby union stadiums
- List of soccer stadiums in Australia
- List of Oceanian stadiums by capacity
- Lists of stadiums
