= List of National Rugby League stadiums =

This is a list of National Rugby League stadiums by capacity.

== Current NRL stadiums ==
This list includes all regular home grounds of National Rugby League clubs. Some of these venues have also hosted the Australian or New Zealand national rugby league teams.

NRL club venues
Stadium	Image	City	State	Capacity	Tenants
Accor Stadium		Sydney Olympic Park, Sydney	New South Wales	84,000	NRL Grand Final Canterbury-Bankstown Bulldogs; South Sydney Rabbitohs; New South Wales Blues
Suncorp Stadium		Brisbane	Queensland	52,500	Brisbane Broncos; Redcliffe Dolphins; Queensland Maroons
Allianz Stadium		Moore Park, Sydney	New South Wales	42,500	Sydney Roosters; South Sydney Rabbitohs
McDonald Jones Stadium		Newcastle	New South Wales	33,000	Newcastle Knights
AAMI Park		Melbourne	Victoria	30,050	Melbourne Storm
CommBank Stadium		Parramatta, Sydney	New South Wales	30,000	Parramatta Eels; Wests Tigers; Penrith Panthers
Go Media Stadium		Auckland	New Zealand	30,000	New Zealand Warriors
Cbus Super Stadium		Robina, Gold Coast	Queensland	27,400	Gold Coast Titans
Queensland Country Bank Stadium		Townsville	Queensland	25,000	North Queensland Cowboys
GIO Stadium		Canberra	Australian Capital Territory	25,011	Canberra Raiders
WIN Stadium		Wollongong	New South Wales	23,750	St George Illawarra Dragons
HBF Park		Perth	Western Australia	20,500	Perth Bears
Jubilee Stadium		Kogarah, Sydney	New South Wales	20,500	St George Illawarra Dragons
Leichhardt Oval		Leichhardt, Sydney	New South Wales	20,000	Wests Tigers
Brookvale Oval		Brookvale, Sydney	New South Wales	18,000	Manly-Warringah Sea Eagles
Campbelltown Stadium		Campbelltown, Sydney	New South Wales	17,500	Wests Tigers
Sharks Stadium		Cronulla, Sydney	New South Wales	15,000	Cronulla-Sutherland Sharks
Kayo Stadium		Redcliffe, Brisbane	Queensland	11,500	Redcliffe Dolphins

== Occasional stadiums ==
These venues are not the permanent home venues of NRL clubs, but intermittently host club NRL matches.

Occasional venues
Stadium	Image	City	State	Capacity	Used by
Melbourne Cricket Ground		Melbourne	Victoria	100,024	State of Origin Melbourne Storm
Allegiant Stadium		Las Vegas	Nevada	65,000	Rugby League Las Vegas
Perth Stadium		Perth	Western Australia	60,000	State of Origin South Sydney Rabbitohs; Newcastle Knights; Redcliffe Dolphins
Adelaide Oval		Adelaide	South Australia	53,583	State of Origin Adelaide Rams†; Sydney Roosters
Docklands Stadium		Melbourne	Victoria	53,000	State of Origin Melbourne Storm
Eden Park		Auckland	New Zealand	50,000	State of Origin New Zealand Warriors
Sydney Cricket Ground		Moore Park, Sydney	New South Wales	48,601	Sydney Roosters
Kardinia Park		Geelong	Victoria	40,000	Melbourne Storm
The Gabba		Brisbane	Queensland	36,000	Brisbane Broncos
Welllington Regional Stadium		Wellington	New Zealand	34,500	New Zealand Warriors; Canterbury-Bankstown Bulldogs; Canberra Raiders
Te Kaha Stadium		Christchurch	New Zealand	30,000	New Zealand Warriors; South Island Kea (proposed team)
Rotorua International Stadium		Rotorua	New Zealand	26,000	New Zealand Warriors
Waikato Stadium		Hamilton	New Zealand	25,800	Wests Tigers
Yarrow Stadium		New Plymouth	New Zealand	25,500	New Zealand Warriors
McLean Park		Napier	New Zealand	22,000	New Zealand Warriors
Central Coast Stadium		Gosford	New South Wales	20,059	Sydney Roosters; New Zealand Warriors
Lavington Sports Ground		Albury	New South Wales	20,000	Manly-Warringah Sea Eagles
North Sydney Oval		North Sydney	New South Wales	20,000	South Sydney Rabbitohs; Sydney Roosters; Perth Bears
Rugby League Park		Christchurch	New Zealand	18,000	Penrith Panthers
Barlow Park		Cairns	Queensland	18,000	South Sydney Rabbitohs
North Hobart Oval		Hobart	Tasmania	18,000	Melbourne Storm
Belmore Sports Ground		Belmore. Sydney	New South Wales	17,000	Canterbury-Bankstown Bulldogs
Seiffert Oval		Queanbeyan	New South Wales	15,000	Canberra Raiders
Marrara Oval		Darwin	Northern Territory	14,000	Sydney Roosters; Gold Coast Titans; Parramatta Eels; Redcliffe Dolphins
Coffs Harbour International Stadium		Coffs Harbour	New South Wales	15,000	Cronulla-Sutherland Sharks
Sunshine Coast Stadium		Sunshine Coast	Queensland	12,000	Redcliffe Dolphins; South Sydney Rabbitohs; Melbourne Storm
Stadium Mackay		Mackay	Queensland	12,000	North Queensland Cowboys; Canterbury-Bankstown Bulldogs; Gold Coast Titans; Brisbane Broncos; New Zealand Warriors; Canberra Raiders; Manly-Warringah Sea Eagles; Penrith Panthers; Sydney Roosters
Latrobe City Stadium		Morwell	Victoria	12,000	Melbourne Storm
Apex Oval		Dubbo	New South Wales	11,000	South Sydney Rabbitohs
Eureka Stadium		Ballarat	Victoria	11,000	Melbourne Storm
Carrington Park		Bathurst	New South Wales	10,000	Penrith Panthers
Scully Park		Tamworth	New South Wales	10,000	Wests Tigers
Geohex Park		Wagga Wagga	New South Wales	10,000	Canberra Raiders
Mackay Showground		Mackay	Queensland	10,000	North Queensland Cowboys
Port Macquarie Regional Stadium		Port Macquarie	New South Wales	10,000	Cronulla-Sutherland Sharks; Brisbane Broncos; Penrith Panthers; Canterbury-Bankstown Bulldogs
Clive Berghofer Stadium		Toowoomba	Queensland	9,000	Brisbane Broncos; Gold Coast Titans; St George Illawarra Dragons
Casey Fields		Melbourne	Victoria	9,000	Melbourne Storm
Salter Oval		Bundaberg	Queensland	8,000	Canterbury-Bankstown Bulldogs
Browne Park		Rockhampton	Queensland	8,000	Parramatta Eels; Redcliffe Dolphins
Wade Park		Orange	New South Wales	8,000	Newcastle Knights
Maitland Sportsground		Mainland	New South Wales	8,000	Parramatta Eels; Newcastle Knights
Albury Sports Ground		Albury	New South Wales	8,000	Melbourne Storm
Marley Brown Oval		Gladstone	Queensland	5,000	Gold Coast Titans; Manly-Warringah Sea Eagles
Leprechaun Park		Mackay	Queensland	5,000	North Queensland Cowboys
Tiger Park		Mackay	Queensland	5,000	North Queensland Cowboys
Anzac Oval		Alice Springs	Northern Territory	4,000	Penrith Panthers; Parramatta Eels; West Tigers; Gold Coast Titans
Alec Inch Oval		Mount Isa	Queensland	4,000	North Queensland Cowboys

== Proposed redevelopments and new NRL stadiums ==
Following is a list of current proposals for redevelopment or replacement of current NRL stadiums.

Proposed redevelopments and new stadiums
Stadium	Image	City	State	Approx. Capacity	Opening	Potential Tenants
Macquarie Point Stadium		Hobart	Tasmania	23,000	2031	State of Origin Melbourne Storm
PNG Football Stadium		Port Moresby	Papua New Guinea	14,800	2028	Papua New Guinea Chiefs

== Former NRL stadiums ==
These venues have irregularly or previously hosted National Rugby League rugby league matches.

Former NRL club venues
Stadium	Image	City	State	Capacity	Period in use	Previous Tenants
QEII Stadium ≠		Brisbane	Queensland	60,000	1998–2003	Brisbane Broncos
Sydney Football Stadium ‡		Moore Park, Sydney	New South Wales	45,500	1988–2018	Sydney Roosters; St George Illawarra Dragons
Lancaster Park ‡		Christchurch	New Zealand	38,628	2004–06, 2010	Penrith Panthers
Willows Sports Complex ‡		Townsville	Queensland	26,500	1995-2019	North Queensland Cowboys
Sydney Showground Stadium ≠		Sydney	New South Wales	24,000	2001–05	Canterbury-Bankstown Bulldogs
BlueBet Stadium≠		Penrith, Sydney	New South Wales	22,500	1967–2024	Penrith Panthers
Parramatta Stadium ≠		Sydney	New South Wales	20,741	1998–2016	Parramatta Eels
Owen Delany Park		Taupō	New Zealand	20,000	2011	Cronulla-Sutherland Sharks
WACA Ground ≠		Perth	Western Australia	20,000	1995–1997	WA Reds †
McLean Park		Napier	New Zealand	19,700	2015	Melbourne Storm
Olympic Park Stadium ‡		Melbourne	Victoria	18,500	1990, 1993, 1998–00, 2002–09	State Of Origin; St. George Dragons †; Melbourne Storm
Carrara Stadium ≠		Gold Coast	Queensland	18,000	1998; 2007	Gold Coast Chargers †; Gold Coast Titans
Hindmarsh Stadium ≠		Adelaide	South Australia	17,000	1998; 2006; 2009	Adelaide Rams †; Penrith Panthers; Cronulla-Sutherland Sharks
Bennett Oval		Whyalla	South Australia	8,000	1998	Adelaide Rams †

- Capacity shown is as it was during the time in use

† Club no longer exists in NRL
‡ Venue no longer exists
≠ Venue has since undergone renovation or complete re-build

== See also ==
- List of Australian Football League grounds
- List of Australian cricket grounds
- List of ice rinks in Australia
- List of indoor arenas in Australia
- List of National Basketball League (Australia) venues
- List of Australian rugby union stadiums
- List of soccer stadiums in Australia
- List of Oceanian stadiums by capacity
