= List of National Basketball League (Australia) venues =

The following list includes all current and former arenas used by current and defunct teams playing in the National Basketball League (NBL) during the 2024–25 NBL season. The New Zealand Breakers, South East Melbourne Phoenix and Tasmania JackJumpers all use multiple home venues. Other information included in this list are arena locations, seating capacities, years opened and in use.

The Afterpay Arena, home to the Sydney Kings and the largest indoor arena in Australia, has the highest capacity of any current NBL arena at 18,200. Opening in 2019, Nissan Arena, home to the Brisbane Bullets is the newest venue in use. The oldest venue in use is the Silverdome, having opened in 1984.

Two of the venues used in the NBL, RAC Arena and John Cain Arena, the main home venue for the two Melbourne teams, are both retractable roof venues.

Capacities listed are the venue capacity for NBL games and not the overall venue capacity.

== Current main arenas ==
| Image | Arena | Location | Team(s) | Capacity | Opened | Ref(s) |
|---|---|---|---|---|---|---|
| | Adelaide Entertainment Centre | Adelaide, South Australia | Adelaide 36ers | 10,000 | 1991 | |
| | Afterpay Arena | Sydney, New South Wales | Sydney Kings | 18,200 | 1999 | |
| | Brisbane Entertainment Centre | Brisbane, Queensland | Brisbane Bullets | 10,500 | 1986 | |
| | Cairns Convention Centre | Cairns, Queensland | Cairns Taipans | 5,300 | 1996 | |
| | John Cain Arena | Melbourne, Victoria | Melbourne United | 10,300 | 2000 | |
| | John Cain Arena | Melbourne, Victoria | South East Melbourne Phoenix | 10,300 | 2000 | |
| | MyState Bank Arena | Hobart, Tasmania | Tasmania JackJumpers | 4,340 | 1989 | |
| | RAC Arena | Perth, Western Australia | Perth Wildcats | 14,846 | 2012 | |
| | Spark Arena | Auckland, New Zealand | New Zealand Breakers | 9,740 | 2007 | |
| | WIN Entertainment Centre | Wollongong, New South Wales | Illawarra Hawks | 6,000 | 1998 | |

== Secondary arenas ==
| Image | Arena | Location | Team(s) | Capacity | Opened | Ref(s) |
|---|---|---|---|---|---|---|
| | State Basketball Centre | Wantirna South, Victoria | South East Melbourne Phoenix | 3,200 | 2011 | |
| | Gippsland Regional Indoor Sports Stadium | Traralgon, Victoria | South East Melbourne Phoenix | 3,000 | 2020 | |
| | Nissan Arena | Brisbane, Queensland | Brisbane Bullets | 5,000 | 2019 | |
| | Silverdome | Launceston, Tasmania | Tasmania JackJumpers | 4,000 | 1984 | |

== Future or proposed arenas ==
| Arena | Team | Location | Capacity | Opening | Reference |
|---|---|---|---|---|---|
| Gold Coast Arena | TBD | Gold Coast, Queensland | 12,000 | 2030 | |
| Gabba Entertainment and Housing Precinct | Brisbane Bullets | Brisbane, Queensland | 17,000 | 2032 | |

== Former arenas ==
| Team(s) | Arena | Years used | Capacity | Opened | Closed | Location |
|---|---|---|---|---|---|---|
| Adelaide 36ers | Apollo Stadium | 1982–1991 | 3,000 | 1969 | 1997 | Richmond, South Australia |
| Adelaide 36ers | Titanium Security Arena | 1992-2019 | 8000 | 1992 | present | Findon, South Australia |
| Brisbane Bullets | Auchenflower Stadium | 1979–1983 | 2,000 | 1973 | present | Brisbane, Queensland |
| Brisbane Bullets | Brisbane Convention & Exhibition Centre | 1998–2008, 2016–2019 | 4,000 | 1995 | present | Brisbane, Queensland |
| Brisbane Bullets | Sleeman Sports Centre | 1984–1986 | 2,700 | 1982 | present | Chandler, Queensland |
| Cairns Taipans | Cairns Pop-Up Arena | 2020–2021 | 2,000 | 2020 | 2021 | Cairns, Queensland |
| Illawarra Hawks | Beaton Park Stadium | 1979–1997 | 2,000 | 1965 | present | Wollongong, New South Wales |
| Melbourne United | Albert Park Basketball Stadium | 1984–1987 | 2,000 | 1958 | 1997 | Albert Park, Victoria |
| Melbourne United | Bendigo Stadium | 2021 | 4,000 | 1976 | present | Bendigo, Victoria |
| Melbourne United | The Glass House | 1988–1991 | 7,200 | 1956 | present | Olympic Park, Victoria |
| Melbourne United | National Tennis Centre at Flinders Park | 1992–2000 | 14,820 | 1988 | present | Melbourne Park, Victoria |
| Melbourne United | Margaret Court Arena | 2015–2016 | 7,500 | 1988 | present | Melbourne Park, Victoria |
| Melbourne United | State Netball and Hockey Centre | 2002–2017 | 3,500 | 2001 | present | Melbourne, Victoria |
| New Zealand Breakers | Eventfinda Stadium | 2003–2019 | 4,400 | 1991 | present | Auckland, New Zealand |
| New Zealand Breakers | Silverdome | 2021 | 4,000 | 1984 | present | Launceston, Tasmania |
| New Zealand Breakers | The Trusts Arena | 2004–2006 | 4,901 | 2004 | present | Henderson, New Zealand |
| Perth Wildcats | Perry Lakes Basketball Stadium | 1982–1986 | 1,500 | 1962 | 2010 | Floreat, Western Australia |
| Perth Wildcats | Challenge Stadium | 1987–1990, 2002–2012 | 4,500 | 1986 | present | Mount Claremont, Western Australia |
| Perth Wildcats | Perth Entertainment Centre | 1990–2002 | 8,200 | 1974 | 2002 | Perth |
| Perth Wildcats | Burswood Dome | 2004 | 8,500 | 1987 | 2013 | Burswood, Western Australia |
| Sydney Kings | State Sports Centre | 1988–1989, 2012, 2016 | 5,006 | 1984 | present | Sydney Olympic Park, New South Wales |
| Sydney Kings | Sydney Entertainment Centre | 1990–1999, 2000–2015 | 10,517 | 1983 | 2015 | Haymarket, New South Wales |

== Defunct teams ==
| Team | Arena | Years used | Capacity | Opened | City |
|---|---|---|---|---|---|
| Canberra Cannons (1979–2003) | Canberra Showgrounds | 1979–1980 | Unknown | Unknown | Canberra, Australian Capital Territory |
| Canberra Cannons (1979–2003) | AIS Arena | 1981–2003 | 5,200 | 1981 | Canberra, Australian Capital Territory |
| Devonport Warriors (1984–1985) | Devonport Stadium | 1983–1984 | Unknown | Unknown | Devonport, Tasmania |
| Eastside Melbourne Spectres Nunawading Spectres (1979–1991) | Burwood Stadium | 1979–1991 | 2,000 | Unknown | Nunawading, Victoria |
| Forestville Eagles (1981) | Apollo Stadium | 1981 | 3,000 | 1969 | Richmond, South Australia |
| Frankston Bears (1983–1984) | Frankston Stadium | 1983–1984 | Unknown | Unknown | Frankston, Victoria |
| Geelong Supercats Geelong Cats (1982–1996) | Corio Leisure Centre | 1982–1985 | Unknown | 1976 | Geelong, Victoria |
| Geelong Supercats Geelong Cats (1982–1996) | Geelong Arena | 1986–1996 | 2,000 | Unknown | Geelong, Victoria |
| Glenelg Tigers (1979) | Apollo Stadium | 1979 | 3,000 | 1969 | Richmond, South Australia |
| Gold Coast Rollers Gold Coast Cougars (1990–1996) | Carrara Indoor Stadium | 1990–1996 | 2,992 | Unknown | Carrara, Queensland |
| Gold Coast Blaze (2007–2012) | Gold Coast Convention & Exhibition Centre | 2007–2012 | 5,269 | 2004 | Broadbeach, Queensland |
| Hobart Devils Hobart Tassie Devils (1983–1996) | Kingborough Sports Centre | 1983–1989 | 1,800 | 1979 | Hobart, Tasmania |
| Hobart Devils Hobart Tassie Devils (1983–1996) | Derwent Entertainment Centre | 1989–1996 | 5,400 | 1989 | Hobart, Tasmania |
| Hunter Pirates (2003–2006) | Newcastle Entertainment Centre | 2003–2006 | 4,658 | 1992 | Broadmeadow, New South Wales |
| Launceston Casino City (1980–1982) | Dowling Street Stadium | 1980–1982 | 1,500 | Unknown | Launceston, Tasmania |
| Newcastle Falcons (1979–1999) | Broadmeadow Basketball Stadium | 1979–1991 | 2,200 | 1969 | Broadmeadow, New South Wales |
| Newcastle Falcons (1979–1999) | Newcastle Entertainment Centre | 1992–1999 | 4,658 | 1992 | Broadmeadow, New South Wales |
| North Melbourne Giants Coburg Giants (1980–1998) | Ken Watson Stadium | 1980–1983 | Unknown | Unknown | North Melbourne, Victoria |
| North Melbourne Giants Coburg Giants (1980–1998) | The Glass House | 1984–1998 | 7,200 | 1956 | North Melbourne, Victoria |
| Singapore Slingers (2006–2008) | Singapore Indoor Stadium | 2006–2008 | 12,000 | 1989 | Singapore |
| South Dragons (2006–2009) | Hisense Arena | 2006–2009 | 10,500 | 2000 | Melbourne Park, Victoria |
| South East Melbourne Magic (1991–1998) | National Tennis Centre | 1991–1998 | 14,820 | 1988 | Melbourne Park, Victoria |
| Southern Melbourne Saints St. Kilda Saints Westside Melbourne Saints (1979–1991) | Albert Park Basketball Stadium | 1979–1983 | 2,000 | Unknown | Albert Park, Victoria |
| Southern Melbourne Saints St. Kilda Saints Westside Melbourne Saints (1979–1991) | The Glass House | 1984–1991 | 7,200 | 1956 | Albert Park, Victoria |
| Sydney Spirit West Sydney Razorbacks (1998–2009) | Whitlam Leisure Centre | 1998-2000 | 2,500 | 1994 | Sydney, New South Wales |
| Sydney Spirit West Sydney Razorbacks (1998–2009) | State Sports Centre | 2001-2009 | 5,006 | 1984 | Sydney, New South Wales |
| Sydney Supersonics City of Sydney Astronauts (1979–1987) | Alexandria Stadium | 1979–1985 | Unknown | Unknown | Sydney, New South Wales |
| Sydney Supersonics City of Sydney Astronauts (1979–1987) | State Sports Centre | 1986–1987 | 5,006 | 1984 | Sydney, New South Wales |
| Townsville Crocodiles Townsville Suns (1993–1998) | Townsville Entertainment & Convention Centre | 1993–2014, 2015–2016 | 5,257 | 1993 | Townsville, Queensland |
| Townsville Crocodiles Townsville Suns (1993–1998) | Townsville RSL Stadium | 2014–2015 | 2,500 | 2011 | Townsville, Queensland |
| Victoria Giants Victoria Titans (1998–2004) | National Tennis Centre | 1998–2000 | 14,820 | 2000 | Melbourne Park, Victoria |
| Victoria Giants Victoria Titans (1998–2004) | Vodafone Arena | 2000–2002 | 10,500 | 2000 | Melbourne Park, Victoria |
| Victoria Giants Victoria Titans (1998–2004) | Melbourne Sports & Aquatic Centre | 2003–2004 | 1,800 | 1997 | Melbourne Park, Victoria |
| West Adelaide Bearcats (1979–1984) | Apollo Stadium | 1979–1984 | 3,000 | 1969 | Richmond, South Australia |
| West Sydney Westars Bankstown Bruins (1979–1987) | Bankstown Basketball Stadium | 1979–1985 | 2,500 | Unknown | Sydney, New South Wales |
| West Sydney Westars Bankstown Bruins (1979–1987) | State Sports Centre | 1986–1987 | 5,006 | 1984 | Sydney, New South Wales |
| West Torrens Eagles (1980) | Apollo Stadium | 1980 | 3,000 | 1969 | Richmond, South Australia |

== See also ==
- List of A-League stadiums
- List of Australian Football League grounds
- List of Australian cricket grounds
- List of ice rinks in Australia
- List of indoor arenas in Australia
- List of National Rugby League stadiums
- List of Australian rugby league stadiums
- List of Australian rugby union stadiums
- List of soccer stadiums in Australia
- List of Oceanian stadiums by capacity
