= List of cricket grounds in Australia =

Locations of all active stadia which have hosted an international cricket match. Last international cricket match played at any venue between 2022–23.

This is a list of cricket grounds in Australia. The list includes all grounds that have been used for Test, One Day International, Twenty20 International, first-class, List A and domestic Twenty20 cricket matches. Grounds that have hosted international cricket games are listed in bold. The Melbourne Cricket Ground has hosted the most first-class games in Australia, with 663 games as of the 2010–11 season. The Melbourne Cricket Ground has hosted the most List A games, with 228, and the Adelaide Oval and the WACA Ground have both hosted 16 Twenty20 games. The Melbourne Cricket Ground has hosted 884 games overall, an Australian record.

== Australian Capital Territory ==
Ground name	Location	First used	Last used	First-class games	List A games	Twenty20 games	Notes
**Manuka Oval**	Canberra	1978–79	current	5	16	0	* ACT Comets (Futures League) * ACT Meteors (WNCL Ruth Preddey Cup); Hosts the Prime Minister's XI game each year and also hosts ODI matches.

== New South Wales ==
Ground name	Location	First used	Last used	First-class games	List A games	Twenty20 games	Notes
The Domain	Sydney	1856–57	1868–69	6	0	0	No longer used for cricket
Albert Ground	Redfern	1870–71	1876–77	5	0	0	No longer exists.
**Sydney Cricket Ground**	Sydney	1877–78	current	655	208	3	Used for Test, ODI and Twenty20 International cricket
Sydney Cricket Ground No. 2	Sydney	1966–67	1966–67	1	0	0	Located between the SCG and the Sydney Sports Ground. Hosted one game in 1966–67. Demolished along with the Sports Ground in 1986 to make for the Sydney Football Stadium.
Oakes Oval	Lismore	1979–80	2005–06	3	1	0	Also hosted World Series Cricket games and one Women's ODI game.
**No. 1 Sports Ground**	Newcastle	1981–82	2009–10	20	1	1	Damaged by the 1989 Newcastle earthquake. Record crowd of 10 652 for a 2007 KFC Twenty20 Big Bash game. Also hosted Women's ODI, Youth Test and Youth ODI games.
Lavington Sports Ground	Albury	1989–90	1991–92	2	1	0	Hosted one ODI during the 1992 World Cup.
**North Sydney Oval**	Sydney	1989–90	current	3	24	2	Also hosted Women's Test, Women's ODI and Youth Test matches, as well as the 2007 KFC Twenty20 Big Bash final between New South Wales and Victoria.
**Hurstville Oval**	Sydney	1995–96	current	2	2	0	Also hosted Women's ODI, Women's Twenty20 International and Youth ODI games.
**Bankstown Oval**	Sydney	1996–97	current	2	4	0	Also hosted Women's Test, Women's ODI and Youth Test matches.
North Dalton Park	Wollongong	1996–97	current	0	3	0	
**Coffs Harbour International Stadium**	Coffs Harbour	1997–98	current	0	4	1	
**Drummoyne Oval**	Sydney	2002–03	current	1	4	0	
**Bradman Oval**	Bowral	2003–04	current	0	1	0	
**Stadium Australia**	Sydney	2002–03	current	0	3	10	Hosted the 2008–09 KFC Twenty20 Big Bash Final. Also hosted both Men's and Women's Twenty20 International matches.
**Sydney Showground Stadium**	Sydney	2014-15	current	0	0	20	Used for Sydney Thunder home games in the Big Bash League. Also hosted matches in the 2020 ICC Women's T20 World Cup
**Blacktown International Sportspark**	Sydney	2010–11	current	1	0	0	
**University Oval**	Sydney	1898–99	2015–16				Hosted single Women's test match.
**Central Coast Stadium**	Gosford						Hosted single Women's Test match.

== Northern Territory ==
Ground name	Location	First used	Last used	First-class games	List A games	Twenty20 games	Notes
**Marrara Oval**	Darwin	2003	current	3	7	2	Hosted Test and ODI games.
**Gardens Oval**	Darwin	2006	current	1	0	0	Also hosted Women's ODI, Women's Twenty20 International and Youth ODI games.
Traeger Park	Alice Springs	1987–88	2019–20	0	2	2	

== Queensland ==
Ground name	Location	First used	Last used	First-class games	List A games	Twenty20 games	Notes
**Brisbane Showgrounds**	Brisbane	1892–93	1930–31	28	0	0	Hosted two Tests. No longer used for cricket
**The Gabba**	Brisbane	1897–98	current	462	192	15	Used for Test, ODI and Twenty20 International cricket.
Salter Oval	Bundaberg	1982–83	1994–95	1	2	0	
**Endeavour Park No. 1**	Townsville	1986–87	2012–13	0	0	0	Hosted Youth ODI matches.
**Endeavour Park No. 2**	Townsville	2012–13	2012–13	0	0	0	Hosted Youth ODI matches.
**Carrara Stadium**	Gold Coast	1990–91	current	1	1	4	Currently hosts T20I and Big Bash League Matches
**Kerrydale Oval**	Gold Coast						Hosted several Women's Twenty20 matches.
**Roy Henzell Oval**	Caloundra	1992–93	1992–93	1	0	0	Also hosted Youth ODI games.
**Heritage Oval**	Toowoomba	1994–95	2006–07	1	0	1	Also hosted Youth Test match.
Newtown Oval	Maryborough	1994–95	1994–95	1	0	0	
**Great Barrier Reef Arena**	Mackay	1988–89	current	4	2	0	Hosted one ODI during the 1992 World Cup that was abandoned after two balls. Used for WODI games between Australia and India in 2021.
Barlow Park	Cairns	1991–92	1995–96	0	2	0	
**Cazalys Stadium**	Cairns	1997–98	2008–09	5	7	1	Hosted two Test matches.
**Allan Border Field**	Brisbane	1999–2000	current	12	5	1	Hosted the 2002–03 Sheffield Shield final when the Gabba was unavailable. Also hosted Women's ODI, Women's Twenty20 International and Youth ODI games.
Fretwell Park	Cairns	2006	2006	1	2	0	
**Riverway Stadium**	Townsville	2009	current	3	4	0	
**Peter Burge Oval**	Brisbane	1999–00	2016–17				Hosted Youth ODIs and Women's ODI matches.
**John Blanck Oval**	Sunshine Coast						Hosted single Women's ODI match and several Youth ODI matches.

== South Australia ==
Ground name	Location	First used	Last used	First-class games	List A games	Twenty20 games	Notes
**Adelaide Oval**	Adelaide	1877–78	current	583	189	16	Hosted Test, ODI and Twenty20 International cricket.
Unley Oval	Adelaide	1902–03	1902–03	1	0	0	
**Karen Rolton Oval**	Adelaide	2018–19	current	1			Hosted single Women’s ODI match
Park 25/Gladys Elphick Park	Adelaide	2020–21	current	0	0	0	
Glenelg Oval	Adelaide	2013–14	current	9	0	0	
Football Park	Adelaide	1986–87	1986–87	0	2	0	Also hosted World Series Cricket matches Hosted two McDonald's Cup day/night matches
**Berri Oval**	Berri	1992	1992	0	1	0	Hosted one ODI during the 1992 World Cup.
Adelaide Oval No. 2	Adelaide	1996–97	1996–97	0	1	0	
Kensington Oval	Adelaide						
Barton Oval	Adelaide						Hosted single Women's Test match.
**Woodville Oval**	Adelaide						Hosted single Women's ODI match.

== Tasmania ==
Ground name	Location	First used	Last used	First-class games	List A games	Twenty20 games	Notes
**NTCA Ground**	Launceston	1850–51	2009–10	81	21	1	Hosted first ever first-class game in Australia. Also hosted one ODI and Youth ODI games.
Lower Domain Ground	Hobart	1857–58	1857–58	1	0	0	No longer exists.
**TCA Ground**	Hobart	1906–07	1986–87	86	13	0	Hosted one ODI in 1985 between Sri Lanka and West Indies. Also hosted a Youth Test match.
**Devonport Oval**	Devonport	1977–78	1997–98	27	10	1	Also known as the Formby Recreation Ground. Also hosted a Youth ODI match.
**Bellerive Oval**	Hobart	1987–88	current	133	92	10	The only ground in Tasmania to have held Test matches. Also held Women's Tests, Women's ODI, Youth Test and Youth ODI matches.
West Park Oval	Burnie	2010–11	2010–11	0	1	0	Also known as Burnie Oval.
York Park	Launceston	2016–17	current	0	0	8	Hosts some Hobart Hurricanes home games in the Big Bash League

== Victoria ==
Ground name	Location	First used	Last used	First-class games	List A games	Twenty20 games	Notes
Emerald Hill Cricket Ground	Melbourne	1851–52	1851–52	1	0	0	Hosted second first-class game in Australia. No longer exists.
**Melbourne Cricket Ground**	Melbourne	1855–56	current	663	245	32	Hosted Test, ODI and Twenty20 International cricket.
East Melbourne Cricket Ground	Melbourne	1880–81	1888–89	4	0	0	Closed in 1921 and demolished.
**Lakeside Stadium**	Melbourne	1907–08	1931–32	2	0	0	Also hosted a Women's ODI game. Converted to a soccer stadium.
Brunswick Street Oval	Melbourne	1925–26	1925–26	1	0	0	
**Punt Road Oval**	Melbourne	1932–33	2001–02	6	5	0	Located next to the MCG. Also hosted Women's Test and Women's ODI matches.
Princes Park	Melbourne	1945–46	1997–98	7	2	0	
**Junction Oval**	Melbourne	1945–46	current	41	9	1	Hosted the 2008–09 Sheffield Shield Final. Also hosted Women's Test, Women's ODI and Youth Test matches.
Waverley Park	Melbourne	1979–80	1979–80	0	1	0	Also hosted twenty World Series Cricket matches. No longer exists.
Wangaratta Showgrounds	Wangaratta	1986–87	2005–06	2	1	0	
Sale Oval	Sale	1989–90	1989–90	1	0	0	
**Eastern Oval**	Ballarat	1990–91	2004–05	1	4	0	Hosted one ODI during the 1992 World Cup.
**Queen Elizabeth Oval**	Bendigo	1991–92	2012–13	3	1	0	Hosted a Women's Test match.
**Docklands Stadium**	Melbourne	2000–01	current	0	12	12	
**Albert Cricket Ground**	Melbourne	2002–03	2002–03	0	0*	0	One List A match was abandoned due to rain
Central Reserve	Melbourne	2005–06	2005–06	0	1	0	
**Deakin Reserve**	Shepparton	2005–06	2005–06	0	1	0	Also hosted Youth Test and ODI matches.
Traralgon Showgrounds	Traralgon	2007–08	2007–08	0	1	0	
Ted Summerton Reserve	Moe	2018–19	Current	0	0	1	
Geelong Cricket Ground	Geelong	2010–11	2010–11	0	1	0	Built to replace Kardinia Park as a cricket venue.
**Kardinia Park**	Geelong	2016–17	Current	0	0	1	Updated 19/02/2017
**Aberfeldie Park**	Melbourne	1977–78	1984–85				Hosted several Women's ODI matches.
**Arden Street Oval**	Melbourne						Hosted single Women's Test match.
**Melbourne Grammar School**	Melbourne						Hosted single Women's ODI match.

Match totals current up to 21 April 2014 (except Kardinia Park; See Notes section)

== Western Australia ==
Ground name	Location	First used	Last used	First-class games	List A games	Twenty20 games	Notes
**Perth Stadium**	Perth	2017–18	current	2	2	5	Hosted Test, ODI and Twenty20 International cricket
**WACA Ground**	Perth	1898–99	current	424	220	16	Hosted Test, ODI and Twenty20 International cricket.
Fremantle Oval	Fremantle	1905–06	1909–10	5	0	0	No longer used for cricket.
Hands Oval	Bunbury	2008–09	2010–11	0	3	0	
**Lilac Hill**	Perth	1990–91	2017–18				Hosted single Women's ODI match.
**Hale School**	Perth						Hosted single Women's Test match.
**Willetton Sports Club No 1**	Perth						Hosted several Women's ODI matches.
**Willetton Sports Club No 2**	Perth						Hosted several Women's ODI matches.

== Future Stadiums ==
Stadium	City	State/Territory	Capacity	Opening Date	Note
Macquarie Point Stadium	Hobart	Tasmania	23,000	2031	It Will Replace Bellerive Oval As Hobart's Main Cricket Venue.
Brisbane Olympic Stadium	Brisbane	Queensland	63,000	2032	It Will Replace The Gabba as Brisbane's Main Cricket Venue.

== Top 10 most games hosted ==
Total matches held	Ground name	City	First game
884	Melbourne Cricket Ground	Melbourne	1855–56
866	Sydney Cricket Ground	Sydney	1877–78
788	Adelaide Oval	Adelaide	1877–78
669	The Gabba	Brisbane	1897–98
660	WACA Ground	Perth	1898–99
235	Bellerive Oval	Hobart	1987–88
103	NTCA Ground	Launceston	1850–51
99	TCA Ground	Hobart	1906–07
50	Junction Oval	Melbourne	1977–78
38	Devonport Oval	Devonport	1977–78

- Total matches held refers to the combined number of first-class, List A and Twenty20 matches held at one ground.

== See also ==
- List of Test cricket grounds – Full international list
- List of Australian Football League grounds
- List of ice rinks in Australia
- List of indoor arenas in Australia
- List of National Basketball League (Australia) venues
- List of Australian rugby league stadiums
- List of Australian rugby union stadiums
- List of soccer stadiums in Australia
- List of Oceanian stadiums by capacity
