= List of Australian rugby league stadiums =

This is a list of Australian rugby league stadiums by capacity.

== National Rugby League stadiums ==
This list includes all regular home grounds of National Rugby League clubs. Some of these venues have also hosted the Australian or New Zealand national rugby league teams.

NRL club venues
Stadium	Image	City	State	Capacity	Tenants
Accor Stadium		Sydney Olympic Park, Sydney	New South Wales	84,000	NRL Grand Final Canterbury-Bankstown Bulldogs South Sydney Rabbitohs New South Wales Blues
Suncorp Stadium		Brisbane	Queensland	52,500	Brisbane Broncos Queensland Maroons Dolphins
Allianz Stadium		Moore Park, Sydney	New South Wales	42,500	Sydney Roosters
McDonald Jones Stadium		Newcastle	New South Wales	33,000	Newcastle Knights
AAMI Park		Melbourne	Victoria	30,050	Melbourne Storm
CommBank Stadium		Parramatta, Sydney	New South Wales	30,000	Parramatta Eels
Go Media Stadium		Auckland	New Zealand	30,000	New Zealand Warriors
Cbus Super Stadium		Gold Coast	Queensland	27,400	Gold Coast Titans
Queensland Country Bank Stadium		Townsville	Queensland	25,000	North Queensland Cowboys
GIO Stadium		Canberra	Australian Capital Territory	25,011	Canberra Raiders
WIN Stadium		Wollongong	New South Wales	23,750	St George Illawarra Dragons
Helloworld Stadium		Penrith, Sydney	New South Wales	22,500	Penrith Panthers
Netstrata Oval		Kogarah, Sydney	New South Wales	20,500	St George Illawarra Dragons
Leichhardt Oval		Leichhardt, Sydney	New South Wales	20,000	Wests Tigers
4 Pines Park		Manly, Sydney	New South Wales	18,000	Manly-Warringah Sea Eagles
Campbelltown Stadium		Campbelltown, Sydney	New South Wales	17,500	Wests Tigers
Ocean Protect Stadium		Cronulla, Sydney	New South Wales	12,000	Cronulla-Sutherland Sharks
Kayo Stadium		Redcliffe, Brisbane	Queensland	11,500	Dolphins

== Occasional stadiums ==
These venues are not the permanent home venues of NRL clubs, but intermittently host club NRL matches.

Occasional venues
Stadium	Image	City	State	Capacity	Used by
Melbourne Cricket Ground		Melbourne	Victoria	100,024	State of Origin Melbourne Storm
Perth Stadium		Perth	Western Australia	60,000	State of Origin South Sydney Rabbitohs Newcastle Knights
Adelaide Oval		Adelaide	South Australia	53,583	State of Origin Adelaide Rams† Sydney Roosters
Marvel Stadium		Melbourne	Victoria	53,000	Melbourne Storm
Eden Park		Auckland	New Zealand	50,000	New Zealand Warriors
Sydney Cricket Ground		Moore Park, Sydney	New South Wales	48,601	Sydney Roosters
GMHBA Stadium		Geelong	Victoria	40,000	Melbourne Storm
The Gabba		Brisbane	Queensland	36,000	Brisbane Broncos
Hnry Stadium		Wellington	New Zealand	34,500	New Zealand Warriors
Waikato Stadium		Hamilton	New Zealand	25,800	Wests Tigers
Yarrow Stadium		New Plymouth	New Zealand	25,500	New Zealand Warriors
McLean Park		Napier	New Zealand	22,000	New Zealand Warriors
HBF Park		Perth	Western Australia	20,500	South Sydney Rabbitohs Manly-Warringah Sea Eagles WA Reds† West Coast Pirates (proposed team)
Polytec Stadium		Gosford	New South Wales	20,059	Sydney Roosters New Zealand Warriors Central Coast Bears (proposed team)
Lavington Sports Ground		Albury	New South Wales	20,000	Manly-Warringah Sea Eagles
North Sydney Oval		North Sydney	New South Wales	20,000	North Sydney Bears† Sydney Roosters
Rugby League Park		Christchurch	New Zealand	18,000	Penrith Panthers
Barlow Park		Cairns	Queensland	18,000	South Sydney Rabbitohs
North Hobart Oval		Hobart	Tasmania	18,000	Melbourne Storm
Belmore Sports Ground		Belmore. Sydney	New South Wales	17,000	Canterbury-Bankstown Bulldogs
TIO Stadium		Darwin	Northern Territory	14,000	Parramatta Eels
C.ex International Stadium		Coffs Harbour	New South Wales	15,000	Cronulla-Sutherland Sharks
Sunshine Coast Stadium		Sunshine Coast	Queensland	12,000	Dolphins South Sydney Rabbitohs
BB Print Stadium		Mackay	Queensland	12,000	Sydney Roosters
Apex Oval		Dubbo	New South Wales	11,000	South Sydney Rabbitohs
Carrington Park		Bathurst	New South Wales	10,000	Penrith Panthers
Scully Park		Tamworth	New South Wales	10,000	Wests Tigers
McDonald's Park		Wagga Wagga	New South Wales	10,000	Canberra Raiders
Salter Oval		Bundaberg	Queensland	8,000	Canterbury-Bankstown Bulldogs
Browne Park		Rockhampton	Queensland	8,000	Dolphins
Marley Brown Oval		Gladstone	Queensland	5,000	Gold Coast Titans Manly-Warringah Sea Eagles

== Proposed redevelopments and new NRL stadiums ==
Following is a list of current proposals for redevelopment or replacement of current NRL stadiums.

Proposed redevelopments and new stadiums
Stadium	City	State	Approx. Capacity	Potential Tenants	Opening/First Use
SoFi Stadium	Los Angeles, CA	United States	70,000	TBD	2024
Hindmarsh Stadiumredevelopment of current stadium	Hindmarsh, Adelaide	South Australia	25,000	TBD	TBD

== Former NRL stadiums ==
These venues have irregularly or previously hosted National Rugby League rugby league matches.

Former NRL club venues
Stadium	Image	City	State	Capacity	Period in use	Previous Tenants
Queensland Sport & Athletics Centre ≠		Brisbane	Queensland	60,000	1998-03	Brisbane Broncos
Docklands Stadium		Melbourne	Victoria	56,347	2001, 2007–10	Melbourne Storm
Sydney Football Stadium ‡		Moore Park, Sydney	New South Wales	45,500	1988-2018	Sydney Roosters St George Illawarra Dragons
Lancaster Park ‡		Christchurch	New Zealand	38,628	2004-06, 2010	Penrith Panthers
Willows Sports Complex ‡		Townsville	Queensland	26,500	1995-2019	North Queensland Cowboys
Sydney Showground Stadium ≠		Sydney	New South Wales	24,000	2001-05	Canterbury-Bankstown Bulldogs
Parramatta Stadium ≠		Sydney	New South Wales	20,741	1998-2016	Parramatta Eels
Owen Delany Park		Taupō	New Zealand	20,000	2011	Cronulla-Sutherland Sharks
McLean Park		Napier	New Zealand	19,700	2015	Melbourne Storm
Olympic Park Stadium ‡		Melbourne	Victoria	18,500	1998-00, 2002–09	Melbourne Storm
Carrara Stadium ≠		Gold Coast	Queensland	18,000	1998 2007	Gold Coast Chargers † Gold Coast Titans
Hindmarsh Stadium ≠		Adelaide	South Australia	17,000	1998 2006 2009	Adelaide Rams † Penrith Panthers Cronulla-Sutherland Sharks

- Capacity shown is as it was during the time in use

† Club no longer exists in NRL

‡ Venue no longer exists

≠ Venue has since undergone renovation or complete re-build

== New South Wales Cup stadiums ==
12 teams contest the 2015 NSW Cup. In addition to those listed below which are based in NSW, the Auckland, New Zealand, based New Zealand Warriors feeder team also compete in the competition.

NSW Cup venues
Stadium	City	State	Capacity	Tenants	NRL affiliate
McDonald Jones Stadium Cessnock Sportsground	New Lambton, Newcastle Cessnock	New South Wales	33,000 10,000	Newcastle Knights	Newcastle Knights
Henson Park	Newtown, Sydney	New South Wales	30,000	Newtown Jets	Cronulla-Sutherland Sharks
WIN Stadium Netstrata Jubilee Stadium	Wollongong Kogarah, Sydney	New South Wales	23,000 20,500	St George Illawarra Dragons	St George Illawarra Dragons
Leichhardt Oval; Campbelltown Stadium	Leichhardt, Sydney; Campbelltown, Sydney	New South Wales	20,000; 20,000	Wests Tigers	Wests Tigers
North Sydney Oval	North Sydney, Sydney	New South Wales	20,000	North Sydney Bears	Melbourne Storm
Belmore Sports Ground	Belmore, Sydney	New South Wales	19,000	Canterbury-Bankstown Bulldogs	Canterbury-Bankstown Bulldogs
Windsor Sporting Complex	Windsor, Sydney	New South Wales	10,000	Penrith Panthers	Penrith Panthers
H.E. Laybutt Field	Blacktown, Sydney	New South Wales	5,000	Blacktown Workers Sea Eagles	Manly-Warringah Sea Eagles
Ringrose Park	Wentworthville, Sydney	New South Wales	5,000	Wentworthville Magpies	Parramatta Eels
Mount Pritchard Oval	Mount Pritchard, Sydney	New South Wales	5,000	Mount Pritchard Mounties	Canberra Raiders
Redfern Oval	Redfern, Sydney	New South Wales	5,000	South Sydney Rabbitohs	South Sydney Rabbitohs

== Queensland Cup Stadiums ==
Queensland Cup venues
Stadium	City	State	Capacity	Tenants	NRL affiliate
Barlow Park	Cairns	Queensland	18,000	Northern Pride RLFC	North Queensland Cowboys
PNG Football Stadium	Port Moresby	Papua New Guinea	14,800	Papua New Guinea Hunters	N/A
Sunshine Coast Stadium	Sunshine Coast	Queensland	12,000	Sunshine Coast Falcons	Melbourne Storm
North Ipswich Reserve	Ipswich	Queensland	10,000	Ipswich Jets	Gold Coast Titans
Stadium Mackay (Virgin Australia Stadium)	Mackay	Queensland	10,000	Mackay Cutters	North Queensland Cowboys
Dolphin Oval	Redcliffe, Brisbane	Queensland	10,000	Redcliffe Dolphins	New Zealand Warriors
Browne Park	Rockhampton	Queensland	5,200	Central Queensland Capras	Brisbane Broncos
Langlands Park	Brisbane	Queensland	5,000	Easts Tigers	Melbourne Storm
BMD Kougari Oval	Wynnum, Brisbane	Queensland	5,000	Wynnum Manly Seagulls	Brisbane Broncos
Bishop Park	Brisbane	Queensland	unknown	Norths Devils	Brisbane Broncos
Brandon Park; Davies Park	South Bank, Brisbane; Logan	Queensland	unknown	Souths Logan Magpies	Brisbane Broncos
Pizzey Park	Gold Coast	Queensland	unknown	Burleigh Bears	Gold Coast Titans
Piggabeen Sports Complex	Gold Coast	New South Wales	unknown	Tweed Heads Seagulls	Gold Coast Titans

== See also ==
- List of Australian Football League grounds
- List of Australian cricket grounds
- List of ice rinks in Australia
- List of indoor arenas in Australia
- List of National Basketball League (Australia) venues
- List of National Rugby League stadiums
- List of Australian rugby union stadiums
- List of soccer stadiums in Australia
- List of Oceanian stadiums by capacity
