= List of indoor arenas in Australia =

This is a list of indoor arenas in Australia.

== Indoor arenas ==
- Total capacity shown. In some cases this may differ from seating capacity.

Image	Arena	Location	Capacity	Team(s)
	Afterpay Arena	Sydney, New South Wales	21,032	Basketball: Sydney Kings; Netball: New South Wales Swifts*; Netball: Giants Netball*
	Rod Laver Arena •	Melbourne, Victoria	17,100	Tennis: Australian Open; Netball: Melbourne Vixens*; Netball: Melbourne Mavericks*
	RAC Arena •	Perth, Western Australia	15,500	Basketball: Perth Wildcats; Netball: West Coast Fever*; Tennis: Hopman Cup
	Brisbane Entertainment Centre	Brisbane, Queensland	13,600	Basketball: Brisbane Bullets
	Adelaide Entertainment Centre	Adelaide, South Australia	11,300	Basketball: Adelaide 36ers Netball: Adelaide Thunderbirds*
	John Cain Arena •	Melbourne, Victoria	11,000	Basketball: Melbourne United*; Basketball: South East Melbourne Phoenix*; Netball: Melbourne Vixens*; Netball: Melbourne Mavericks; Tennis: Australian Open
	Sydney Olympic Park Tennis Centre	Sydney, New South Wales	10,500	Netball: New South Wales Swifts*; Netball: Giants Netball*; Tennis: Sydney International; Tennis: United Cup
	TikTok Entertainment Centre	Sydney, New South Wales	9,000	
	MyState Bank Arena	Hobart, Tasmania	8,600	Basketball: Tasmania JackJumpers; Basketball: Tasmania Jewels; Netball: Melbourne Mavericks
	Adelaide Arena	Adelaide, South Australia	8,000	Basketball: Adelaide 36ers Basketball: Adelaide Lightning; Netball: Adelaide Thunderbirds
	Newcastle Entertainment Centre	Newcastle, New South Wales	7,528	
	Margaret Court Arena •	Melbourne, Victoria	7,500	Netball: Melbourne Vixens; Tennis: Australian Open
	Queensland Tennis Centre	Brisbane, Queensland	7,000	Tennis: Brisbane International
	Icehouse	Melbourne, Victoria	1,500	Ice Hockey: Melbourne Ice; Ice Hockey: Melbourne Mustangs
	Wollongong Entertainment Centre	Wollongong, New South Wales	6,000	Basketball: Illawarra Hawks
	Gold Coast Convention and Exhibition Centre	Gold Coast, Queensland	6,000	
	Cairns Convention Centre	Cairns, Queensland	5,300	Basketball: Cairns Taipans
	Townsville Entertainment and Convention Centre	Townsville, Queensland	5,257	Basketball: Townsville Fire
	AIS Arena	Canberra, Australian Capital Territory	5,200	Basketball: Canberra Capitals
	Tamworth Regional Entertainment Centre	Tamworth, New South Wales	5,100	
	State Sports Centre	Sydney, New South Wales	5,006	Netball: New South Wales Swifts; Netball: GWS Giants Netball Club
	Queensland State Netball Centre	Brisbane, Queensland	5,000	Basketball: Brisbane Bullets; Netball: Queensland Firebirds
	Silverdome (Launceston)	Launceston, Tasmania	5,000	Basketball: Tasmania JackJumpers; Basketball: Tasmania Jewels
	Perth High Performance Centre	Perth, Western Australia	4,500	Basketball: Perth Lynx
	State Netball & Hockey Centre	Melbourne, Victoria	3,500	
	Netball SA Stadium	Adelaide, South Australia	3,200	Netball: Adelaide Thunderbirds
	State Basketball Centre	Melbourne, Victoria	3,200	Basketball: Melbourne Boomers
	Carrara Indoor Stadium	Gold Coast, Queensland	2,992	
	Townsville Stadium	Annandale, Queensland	2,500	Basketball: Townsville Fire
	Dandenong Basketball Stadium	Dandenong, Victoria	2,200	Basketball: Dandenong Rangers
	Broadmeadow Basketball Stadium	Newcastle, New South Wales	2,200	
	Bendigo Stadium	Bendigo, Victoria	4,000	Basketball: Bendigo Spirit
	Western Australian Basketball Centre	Perth, Western Australia	2,000	Basketball: Perth Lynx
	Geelong Arena	Geelong, Victoria	2,000	Basketball: Geelong Venom
	Southern Cross Stadium	Canberra, Australian Capital Territory	2,000	Basketball: Canberra Capitals*
	Lauren Jackson Sports Centre	Albury, New South Wales	1,000	Basketball: Albury Wodonga Bandits
	Brydens Stadium, Sydney Uni Sports & Aquatic Centre	Sydney, New South Wales	1,000	Basketball: Sydney Uni Flames

• Retractable roof venues
* Temporary tenants

== Proposed arenas ==
- Brisbane Indoor Sports Centre (12,000)
- Brisbane Live (17,000)
- Chandler Indoor Sports Centre (10,000)
- Gold Coast Arena (10,000)
- Moreton Bay Indoor Sports Centre (7,000)

== See also ==
- List of Australian Football League grounds
- List of Australian cricket grounds
- List of ice rinks in Australia
- List of National Basketball League (Australia) venues
- List of Australian rugby league stadiums
- List of Australian rugby union stadiums
- List of soccer stadiums in Australia
- List of Oceanian stadiums by capacity
