= Sale Oval =

Cricket ground in Australia

Coordinates: 38°06′20.60″S 147°04′52.03″E

Ground information
- Location: Sale, Australia
- Establishment: 1967 (first recorded match)

Team information
Victoria	(1989)
- As of 21 October 2011; Source: Ground profile

Sale Oval (also known as Sale Cricket Ground) is a cricket ground in Sale, Victoria, Australia. The first recorded match on the ground was in 1967 when Sale-Maffra Cricket Association played the Cricket Club of India in 1967. The ground held its only first-class match in 1989 when Victoria played the touring Sri Lankans.

The ground is also a venue for Australian Rules Football.
