= Newtown Oval =

Cricket ground in Maryborough, Queensland

Coordinates: 25°31′14.45″S 152°41′46.92″E

Ground information
- Location: Maryborough, Australia
- Establishment: 1922 (first recorded match)
- Capacity: 10,000

Team information
Queensland	(1994)
- As of 21 October 2011; Source: Ground profile

Newtown Oval is a cricket ground in Maryborough, Queensland, Australia. The first recorded match on the ground came when Maryborough played Victoria on Christmas Day in 1922. The ground later held its only first-class match in 1994 when Queensland played the touring Zimbabweans, with the match ending in a 4 wicket victory for Queensland.
