= List of A-League Men stadiums =

Since the inception of the A-League Men, Australian association football's highest level annual men's league tournament, 26 soccer stadiums have been used as home grounds for A-League Men clubs.

Of the stadiums currently serving as a team's regular home stadium, Brisbane Roar's Lang Park is the largest stadium in the league at 52,000, whilst Western United's Ironbark Fields is the smallest at 5,000 capacity. The largest capacity stadium ever used in the A-League Men was Stadium Australia at 82,000 capacity which served as the temporary home ground of the Western Sydney Wanderers from 2016-2019 while the Western Sydney Stadium was being constructed. The smallest capacity stadium ever used in the A-League Men was Macedonia Park at 4,000 capacity, which was hosted by Perth Glory. AAMI Park is the only stadium to currently serve as the home ground of multiple teams, with the stadium serving as the home ground of Melbourne City and Melbourne Victory.

== Stadiums ==
Stadiums listed in bold indicate that they are the home grounds of teams participating in the 2025–26 A-League Men season, while those stadiums listed in italics have now been demolished. † For closed or demolished grounds, capacity is taken at closure.

Stadium	Image	Club(s)	Location	Opened	Closed	Capacity	Coordinates	Ref.
**Campbelltown Sports Stadium**		Macarthur FC	Sydney	1955		17,500	34°3′1″S 150°50′1″E	
**Central Coast Stadium**		Central Coast Mariners	Gosford	2000		20,059	33°25′42″S 151°20′17″E	
Docklands Stadium		Melbourne Victory	Melbourne	2000		56,347	37°48′59″S 144°56′51″E	
Eureka Stadium		Western United	Ballarat	1990		11,000	37°32′22″S 143°50′53″E	
**Hindmarsh Stadium**		Adelaide United	Adelaide	1960		16,500	34°54′27″S 138°34′8″E	
Ironbark Fields		Western United	Melbourne	2023		5,000	37°50′30″S 144°37′47″E	
Jubilee Oval		Sydney FC	Sydney	1935		20,500	33°58′19″S 151°7′45″E	
Kardinia Park		Western United	Geelong	1941		40,000	38°9′29″S 144°21′17″E	
**Lang Park**		Brisbane Roar	Brisbane	1914		52,500	27.464929°S 153.009669°E	
Leichhardt Oval		Sydney FC	Sydney	1934		20,000	33°52′7″S 151°9′17″E	
Macedonia Park		Perth Glory	Perth	1986		4,000	31.888388°S 115.822038°E	
**Melbourne Rectangular Stadium**		Melbourne City; Melbourne Victory	Melbourne	2010		30,050	37°49′31″S 144°59′2″E	
**Mount Smart Stadium**		Auckland FC	Auckland	1967		25,000	36°55′6″S 174°48′45″E	
**Newcastle International Sports Centre**		Newcastle Jets	Newcastle	1970		30,000	32°55′8″S 151°43′36″E	
North Harbour Stadium		New Zealand Knights	Auckland	1997		17,500	36°43′37″S 174°42′6″E	
Olympic Park Stadium		Melbourne Victory	Melbourne	1956	2012	18,500	37°49′29″S 144°58′52″E	
Parramatta Stadium		Western Sydney Wanderers	Sydney	1986	2017	20,700	33°48′29″S 150°59′59″E	
**Perth Rectangular Stadium**		Perth Glory	Perth	1910		20,050	31°56′45″S 115°52′12″E	
Robina Stadium		Gold Coast United	Gold Coast	2008		27,690	28°4′1″S 153°22′44″E	
Stadium Australia		Western Sydney Wanderers	Sydney	1999		82,000	33°50′50″S 151°03′47″E	
Sydney Football Stadium		Sydney FC	Sydney	1988	2018	45,500	33°53′21″S 151°13′31″E	
**Sydney Football Stadium**		Sydney FC	Sydney	2022		42,500	33°53′21″S 151°13′31″E	
Sydney Showground Stadium		Western Sydney Wanderers	Sydney	1998		23,500	33°50′35″S 151°4′4″E	
**Wellington Regional Stadium**		Wellington Phoenix	Wellington	2000		34,500	41°16′23″S 174°47′9″E	
**Western Sydney Stadium**		Western Sydney Wanderers	Sydney	2019		30,000	33°48′29″S 150°59′59″E	
Willows Sports Complex		North Queensland Fury	Townsville	1997	2019	26,500	19°18′58″S 146°42′43″E	

== See also ==
- List of record home attendances of Australian soccer clubs
- List of soccer stadiums in Australia
- List of association football stadiums by country
