= Sydney Olympic Park Tennis Centre =

Australian tennis venue

Ken Rosewall Arena
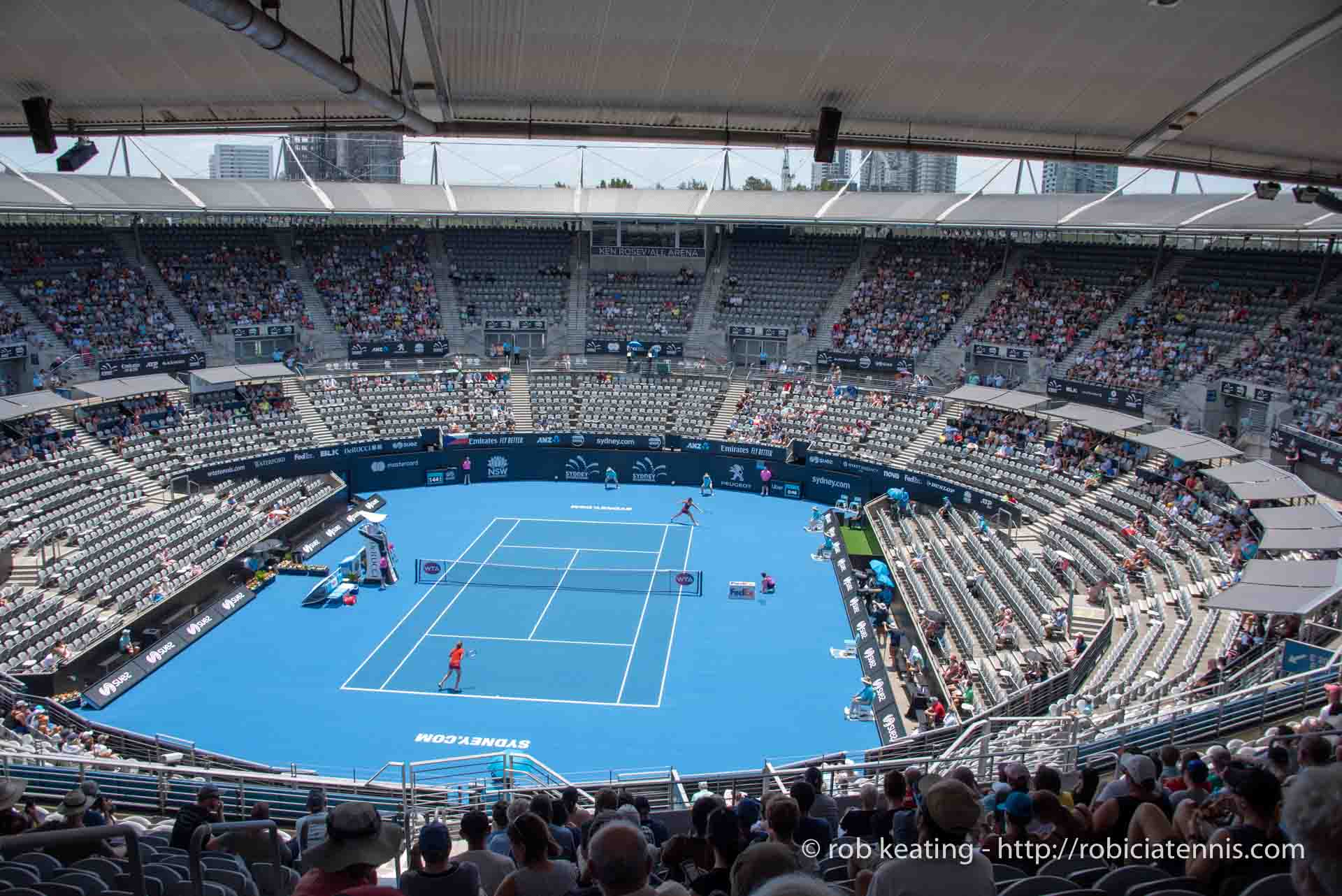
- Ken Rosewall Arena during the 2019 Sydney International (prior to installation of roof)
- Interactive map of Ken Rosewall Arena
- Former names: NSW Tennis Centre
- Location: Sydney Olympic Park, New South Wales
- Coordinates: 33°51′18″S 151°4′20″E
- Owner: Tennis Australia
- Operator: Sydney Olympic Park Authority
- Capacity: 10,500
- Surface: Hard (GreenSet)

Construction
- Groundbreaking: November 1998
- Opened: 8 December 1999
- Cost: AUD42.9 million
- Architects: BVN Architecture, 2000 and Cox Architecture (roof structure), 2020

Tenants
- Sydney International (2000–2019, 2022); Giants Netball (2021–present); New South Wales Swifts (2021–present); Major sporting events hosted; 2000 Summer Olympic tennis tournament; 2000 Summer Paralympic wheelchair tennis tournament; ATP Cup (2020, 2022); United Cup (2023–present)

The Sydney Olympic Park Tennis Centre is a tennis and multi-purpose sports facility in the Sydney Olympic Park suburb of Sydney, New South Wales, Australia. The centre was built in 1999 and hosted the tennis events for the 2000 Summer Olympics. The venue hosted the Sydney International tournament from 2000 to 2019, the Sydney Tennis Classic in 2022, the ATP Cup in 2020 and 2022, and the United Cup since 2023. The main stadium in the centre is the Ken Rosewall Arena, which has a seating capacity of 10,500, and is capable of hosting multiple sports, including tennis and netball.

== Facilities ==
In December 2008, the centre court was renamed Ken Rosewall Arena, named in honour of the Sydney-born tennis player and multiple Grand Slam winner Ken Rosewall. The stadium holds 10,500 people. There are also two other show courts in the precinct seating 4,000 and 2,000 spectators respectively, as well as ten other match courts and six practice courts.

== Refurbishment ==
In January 2019, the New South Wales Government announced a $50.5 million upgrade of the Sydney Olympic Park Tennis Centre, to improve facilities for players and spectators ahead of the ATP Cup multi-nation tennis tournament, which began being held at the venue in 2020. The biggest change to the venue was the construction of a large permanent roof over Ken Rosewall Arena, allowing play to continue on the arena irrespective of the weather conditions. In addition a hardwood playing surface was added to the floor of Ken Rosewall Arena, giving the venue the capability to host sports such as netball and basketball.

The arena was chosen to host the finals matches of the first three editions of the ATP Cup, from 2020 until 2022. The upgrade was completed in time for the 2020 ATP Cup in January.

Super Netball clubs the New South Wales Swifts and Giants Netball were to have moved all home matches to Ken Rosewall Arena ahead of the 2020 season. However, only three days before the 2020 season commenced the New South Wales-Queensland border was shut due to the COVID-19 pandemic, forcing both the Swifts and Giants out of the state and into a Queensland hub; subsequently, neither club played a single home match at the venue in 2020.

Since 2022, the arena has hosted Pulse Alive, a showcase of the creative and performing arts featuring students from NSW Public Schools. Pulse Alive features more than 8800 students performing over three nights and includes dancers, singers, musicians and actors as well as students taking on behind the scenes roles on the VET student production team.

== See also ==
- 2000 Summer Olympics venues
- List of tennis stadiums by capacity
- List of Suncorp Super Netball venues
