= List of soccer stadiums in Australia =

This is a list of stadiums in Australia that host soccer matches, ranked in descending order of capacity. There are a large number of soccer stadiums and pitches in Australia, so this list therefore includes:

- The stadiums of all 12 clubs in the A-League Men as of the 2026–27 season. (Note: Excluding Auckland FC who plays at Mount Smart Stadium (capacity 25,000; in Auckland, New Zealand) and Wellington Phoenix who plays at Wellington Regional Stadium (capacity 34,500; in Wellington, New Zealand).)
- The stadiums of all 11 clubs in the A-League Women as of the 2026–27 season. (Note: Excluding Wellington Phoenix Women who plays at Wellington Regional Stadium (capacity 34,500; in Wellington, New Zealand) and Jerry Collins Stadium (capacity 1,900; in Porirua, New Zealand).)
- All stadiums in Australia that have hosted the Australia men's national soccer team and Australia women's national soccer team.
- All other soccer stadiums with a capacity of at least 5,000.

== Existing stadiums ==
Stadium name (commercial name)	Image	City	Capacity	Team(s)	Shape
Melbourne Cricket Ground		Melbourne	100,024	Australia men's national soccer team	Oval
Stadium Australia (Accor Stadium)		Sydney	83,500	Australia men's national soccer team Australia women's national soccer team	Convertible
Docklands Stadium (Marvel Stadium)		Melbourne	56,347	Australia men's national soccer team Australia women's national soccer team	Oval
Adelaide Oval		Adelaide	53,500	Australia men's national soccer team Australia women's national soccer team	Oval
Lang Park (Suncorp Stadium)		Brisbane	52,500	Australia men's national soccer team Australia women's national soccer team Brisbane Roar	Rectangular
Queensland Sport and Athletics Centre		Brisbane	48,500	Australia women's national soccer team	Oval
Sydney Cricket Ground		Sydney	48,000	Australia men's national soccer team	Oval
Sydney Football Stadium (Allianz Stadium)		Sydney	42,500	Australia men's national soccer team Australia women's national soccer team Sydney FC	Rectangular
The Gabba		Brisbane	42,500	Australia men's national soccer team	Oval
Kardinia Park (GMHBA Stadium)		Geelong	36,000	Australia women's national soccer team	Oval
Melbourne Rectangular Stadium (AAMI Park)		Melbourne	30,000	Australia men's national soccer team Australia women's national soccer team Melbourne City; Melbourne Victory	Rectangular
Newcastle International Sports Centre (McDonald Jones Stadium)		Newcastle	30,000	Australia men's national soccer team Australia women's national soccer team Newcastle Jets	Rectangular
Western Sydney Stadium (CommBank Stadium)		Sydney	30,000	Australia men's national soccer team Australia women's national soccer team Western Sydney Wanderers	Rectangular
North Queensland Stadium (Queensland Country Bank Stadium)		Townsville	25,455	Australia women's national soccer team	Rectangular
Canberra Stadium (GIO Stadium)		Canberra	25,000	Australia men's national soccer team Australia women's national soccer team	Rectangular
Penrith Stadium (BlueBet Stadium)		Penrith	25,000	Australia women's national soccer team	Rectangular
Wollongong Showground (WIN Stadium)		Wollongong	22,000	Australia women's national soccer team Wollongong Wolves	Rectangular
Perth Rectangular Stadium (HBF Park)		Perth	20,500	Australia men's national soccer team Australia women's national soccer team Perth Glory	Rectangular
Central Coast Stadium (Polytec Stadium)		Gosford	20,059	Australia men's national soccer team Australia women's national soccer team Central Coast Mariners; Central Coast Mariners Women	Rectangular
Jubilee Oval (Jubilee Stadium)		Sydney	20,000	Australia women's national soccer team	Oval
Leichhardt Oval		Sydney	20,000	Australia men's national soccer team Australia women's national soccer team Sydney FC Women	Rectangular
WACA Ground		Perth	20,000	Australia men's national soccer team	Oval
Campbelltown Stadium		Sydney	17,500	Australia women's national soccer team Macarthur FC	Rectangular
Belmore Sports Ground		Sydney	17,000	Sydney Olympic	Rectangular
Hindmarsh Stadium (Coopers Stadium)		Adelaide	16,500	Australia men's national soccer team Australia women's national soccer team Adelaide United	Rectangular
Manuka Oval		Canberra	16,000	Australia men's national soccer team Australia women's national soccer team	Oval
Knights Stadium		Melbourne	15,000	Melbourne Knights	Rectangular
Norwood Oval (Coopers Stadium)		Adelaide	15,000	Australia men's national soccer team	Oval
Carrington Park		Bathurst	13,000	Australia women's national soccer team	Rectangular
Lakeside Stadium		Melbourne	12,000	South Melbourne; Australia men's national soccer team Australia women's national soccer team	Rectangular with Athletics track
Latrobe City Stadium		Morwell	12,000	Falcons 2000	Rectangular
Lavington Sports Ground		Albury	12,000	Australia women's national soccer team	Oval
Olympic Village		Melbourne	12,000	Heidelberg United	Rectangular
St George Stadium		Sydney	12,000	Australia men's national soccer team St George	Rectangular
Coffs Harbour International Stadium		Coffs Harbour	10,000	Australia men's national soccer team Australia women's national soccer team	Rectangular
Epping Stadium		Melbourne	10,000	Brunswick Juventus	Rectangular
Green Gully Reserve		Melbourne	10,000	Green Gully	Rectangular
Melita Stadium		Sydney	10,000	Parramatta	Rectangular
Newcastle Number 1 Sports Ground		Newcastle	10,000	Australia men's national soccer team	Oval
North Sydney Oval		Sydney	10,000	Australia women's national soccer team	Oval
Queen Elizabeth Oval		Bendigo	10,000	Australia men's national soccer team	Oval
Sunshine Coast Stadium		Brisbane	10,000	Australia women's national soccer team	Rectangular
Sydney United Sports Centre		Sydney	10,000	Sydney United 58	Rectangular
Clive Berghofer Stadium		Toowoomba	9,000	Toowoomba Raiders	Rectangular
Marconi Stadium		Sydney	9,000	Australia women's national soccer team Marconi Stallions	Rectangular
B.T. Connor Reserve		Melbourne	9,000	Preston Lions	Rectangular
Robertson Oval		Wagga Wagga	9,000	Australia women's national soccer team	Oval
Morshead Park		Ballarat	8,500	Australia women's national soccer team Ballarat City	Rectangular
Oakes Oval		Lismore	8,500	Australia women's national soccer team	Oval
Ballymore Stadium		Brisbane	8,000	Australia women's national soccer team	Rectangular
Kensington Oval		Adelaide	8,000	Australia men's national soccer team	Oval
Lambert Park		Sydney	7,000	APIA Leichhardt	Rectangular
State Centre for Football (ServiceFM Stadium)		Adelaide	7,000	Adelaide Comets	Rectangular
Ilinden Sports Centre		Sydney	6,000	Rockdale Ilinden	Rectangular
Darwin Football Stadium (Apex Steel Stadium)		Darwin	6,000	Darwin Olympic	Rectangular
Marden Sports Complex		Adelaide	6,000	Australia men's national soccer team Australia women's national soccer team Adelaide Blue Eagles; Adelaide United Women	Rectangular
Inglewood Stadium		Perth	5,536	Inglewood United	Rectangular
Bonnyrigg Sports Club		Sydney	5,000	Bonnyrigg White Eagles	Rectangular
Cromer Park		Sydney	5,000	Manly United	Rectangular
Gabbie Stadium		Sydney	5,000	Blacktown City; Hills United	Rectangular
Gungahlin Enclosed Oval		Gungahlin	5,000	Gungahlin United	Oval
Ironbark Fields		Melbourne	5,000	Western United; Western United Women	Rectangular
Jack McLaughlin Oval		Newcastle	5,000	Edgeworth	Oval
Kilburn Sportsplex		Adelaide	5,000	West Adelaide	Rectangular
Lions Stadium		Brisbane	5,000	Lions FC	Rectangular
Litis Stadium		Perth	5,000	Floreat Athena	Rectangular
Newcastle Number 2 Sports Ground		Newcastle	5,000	Newcastle Jets Women	Rectangular
Percy Doyle Reserve		Perth	5,000	Sorrento FC; Joondalup United	Rectangular
Perry Park		Brisbane	5,000	Australia women's national soccer team Brisbane Roar Women; Brisbane Strikers	Rectangular
Seymour Shaw Park		Sydney	5,000	Australia women's national soccer team Sutherland Sharks	Rectangular
Spencer Park		Brisbane	5,000	Australia women's national soccer team Brisbane City	Rectangular
Summit Sports Park		Mount Barker	5,000	Mount Barker United	Rectangular

== Existing stadiums under 5000 capacity ==
Stadium	Image	City	Capacity	Team(s)	Shape
Valentine Sports Park		Sydney	4,000	Australia women's national soccer team	Rectangular
Magic Park		Newcastle	3,500	Broadmeadow Magic	Rectangular
McKellar Park		Canberra	3,500	Australia women's national soccer team Belconnen United; Canberra United	Rectangular
The Home of the Matildas		Melbourne	2,500	Melbourne Victory Women	Rectangular
The Gardens Greyhound and Sporting Complex		Newcastle	2,000	Australia men's national soccer team Australia women's national soccer team	Rectangular
City Football Academy		Melbourne	1,500	Melbourne City Women	Rectangular
SS Anderson Reserve		Melbourne	1,000	Australia women's national soccer team Port Melbourne	Rectangular
Wanderers Football Park		Sydney	1,000	Blacktown Spartans; Western Sydney Wanderers Women	Rectangular

== See also ==
- List of record home attendances of Australian soccer clubs
- List of A-League Men stadiums
- List of Australian Football League grounds
- List of Australian cricket grounds
- List of ice rinks in Australia
- List of indoor arenas in Australia
- List of National Basketball League (Australia) venues
- List of Australian rugby league stadiums
- List of Australian rugby union stadiums
- List of Oceanian stadiums by capacity
- List of association football stadiums by capacity
- List of association football stadiums by country
- List of sports venues by capacity
- Lists of stadiums
- Soccer in Australia
