= List of ice rinks in Australia =

There are 21 ice rinks in total around Australia. They are used for recreational, educational and private use. Most of these ice rinks have private lessons in all aspects of ice sports such as ice hockey and figure skating.

== Current venues ==
Current indoor ice skating venues in Australia.

=== Australian Capital Territory ===
Arena	Address	Coordinates	Capacity	Opened	Surface
Phillip Ice Skating Centre	1 Irving Street, Phillip ACT 2606	35.339664°S 149.084126°E	500	6 December 1980	55m x 25m
AIS Arena (Canberra Brave Arena)(temporary)	26 Leverrier St, Bruce ACT 2617	35.24778°S 149.10111°E	2700	31 May 2025	53m x 25m

=== New South Wales ===
Arena	Address	Coordinates	Capacity	Opened	Surface
The Big Banana Fun Park	351 Pacific Highway, Coffs Harbour NSW 2450	30.274772°S 153.135048°E		November 1999	
Canterbury Olympic Ice Rink	17A Phillips Avenue, Canterbury NSW 2193	33.909760°S 151.113402°E	300	5 March 1971 (temporarily closed Sept 2022)	60m x 30m
Erina Ice Arena	A008 Karalta Rd, Erina NSW 2250	33.437551°S 151.390551°E	1200	November 2003 (Temporarily closed 2019-2022, refurbished/reopened 2022)	60m x 30m
Hunter Ice Skating Stadium	230 Macquarie Rd, Warners Bay NSW 2282	32.962505°S 151.656638°E	1000	2000	60m x 30m
Ice Zoo Ice Rink	689 Gardeners Rd, Alexandria NSW 2015	33.919749°S 151.182778°E		2016	55m x 25m
Liverpool Catholic Club Ice Rink	424-458 Hoxton Park Rd, Liverpool West NSW 2170	33.929260°S 150.874932°E	500	1979	55m x 25m
Macquarie Ice Rink	Macquarie Shopping Centre, Herring Rd & Waterloo Rd, Macquarie Park NSW 2113	33.776828°S 151.120309°E	2000	1981	60m x 30m
Blue Mountains Ice Skating Rink	1 Sublime Point Road, Leura NSW 2780	33.721907°S 150.341282°E	90	2022	600m2

=== Northern Territory ===
Arena	Address	Coordinates	Capacity	Opened	Surface
Darwin Ice Skating Centre	8 Osgood Drive, Eaton NT 0820	12.397278°S 130.862638°E		18 July 2017	30m x 19m

=== Queensland ===
Arena	Address	Coordinates	Capacity	Opened	Surface
Iceworld Olympic Ice Rink	2304 Sandgate Road, Boondall QLD 4034	27.340310°S 153.058338°E	600	2001	60m x 30m
Iceworld Acacia Ridge	1179 Beaudesert Rd, Acacia Ridge QLD 4110	27.577288°S 153.023836°E	600	1979	56m x 26m
Planet Chill Ice-Skating Rink	122 Ferny Ave, Surfers Paradise QLD 4217	27.993396°S 153.427048°E	60	7 February 2013	10m x 15m
Warrina Ice Skating Rink	3-11 Illuka Street, Currajong QLD 4812	19.275181°S 146.770666°E	200	1980	32m x 22m

=== South Australia ===
Arena	Address	Coordinates	Capacity	Opened	Surface
IceArenA	23 James Congdon Drive, Thebarton SA 5031	34.919679°S 138.578061°E	2000	17 September 1981	56m x 26m (secondary rink: 30m x 15m)

=== Victoria ===
Arena	Address	Coordinates	Capacity	Opened	Surface
O'Brien Icehouse	105 Pearl River Rd, Docklands VIC 3008	37.812192°S 144.935678°E	2000 (Henke Rink)	12 February 2010	60m x 30m (Henke Rink); 60m x 30m (Bradbury Rink)
Olympic Ice Skating Centre	1080 Centre Road, Oakleigh South VIC 3167	37.925739°S 145.093929°E	500	7 July 1971	51.8m x 22.2m
IceHQ	1 Blake Street, Reservoir VIC 3073	37.732434°S 145.038050°E	500	1 July 2018	61m x 26m

=== Western Australia ===
Arena	Address	Coordinates	Capacity	Opened	Surface
Cockburn Ice Arena	401 Progress Dr, Bibra Lake WA 6163	32.100013°S 115.821068°E		24 October 2015	60m x 28m (secondary rink: 60m x 30m)
Perth Ice Arena	708 Marshall Rd, Malaga WA 6090	31.856755°S 115.904892°E	1000	April 2009	60m x 28m

== Former venues ==
Former ice skating venues in Australia.

Arena	Address	Coordinates	Capacity	Opened	Closed	Surface
Australian Capital Territory
Paradise Ice Rink	Flemington Rd & Northbourne Avenue, Mitchell ACT 2602	35.233088°S 149.145958°E		16 October 1974	24 June 1979	21.5m x 12m
New South Wales
Sydney Glaciarium	849 George Street West, Sydney NSW 2007	33.883610°S 151.202757°E		25 July 1907	1955	52m x 23m
Ice Palais	1 Driver Ave, Moore Park NSW 2021	33.895107°S 151.224229°E		10 June 1938	22 November 1952	
Dungowan Ice Rink	7 South Steyne, Manly NSW 2095	33.799650°S 151.289597°E		23 June 1949	1951	
Hurlstone Park Ice Palais	686 New Canterbury Road, Hurlstone Park NSW 2203	33.904786°S 151.129264°E		1961	1966	
Homebush Ice Rink	55-57 Parramatta Road, Homebush NSW 2140	33.864745°S 151.085595°E		1960	1980	
Bondi Junction Ice Rink	93-97 Spring Street, Bondi Junction NSW 2022	33.892874°S 151.248959°E			1963	
The Glaciarium Ice Centre	2 Railway Parade, Burwood NSW 2134	33.877947°S 151.106475°E		1964	1969	26m x 51.5m
Prince Alfred Park Ice Skating Rink	Chalmers St, Surry Hills NSW 2010	33.887282°S 151.205666°E		1959	1996/1997	
Blacktown International Ice Arena	8 First Avenue, Blacktown NSW 2148	33.768408°S 150.911180°E		May 1979	28 October 2007	
Sydney Ice Arena	11 Solent Circuit, Baulkham Hills NSW 2153	33.732191°S 150.961754°E		2002	9 October 2017	60m x 30m
Warringah Ice Skating Rink	Lagoon Street, Narrabeen NSW 2101	33.712701°S 151.298339°E		1970s	Late 1990s	
Penrith Ice Palace	7-10 Pattys Place, Jamisontown NSW 2750	33.768823°S 150.672980°E	1500	2000	June 2022	60m x 30m
Queensland
Gold Coast Iceland	15 Strathaird Rd, Bundall QLD 4217	27.007561°S 153.401857°E		1996	2025	56m x 26m
Mowbray Park Ice Rink	234 Shafston Ave, Kangaroo Point QLD 4169	27.478413°S 153.040954°E		1960	1967	
South Australia
Adelaide Glaciarium	91 Hindley Street, Adelaide SA 5000	34.923393°S 138.596080°E	580	6 September 1904	25 June 1907	35m x 26m
St Moritz Adelaide	141 Hindley Street, Adelaide SA 5000	34.923445°S 138.594283°E		1964	Late 1970s	
South Australian Ice Centre	Cnr Portrush and Paynham road, Payneham SA 5070	34.896569°S 138.639713°E		1979	Late 1980s	
Noarlunga Ice Skating Rink	32 David Witton Dr, Noarlunga Centre SA 5168	35.139928°S 138.489185°E		2001	30 June 2016	
Tasmania
Hobart Glaciarium	7 Main Street, Moonah TAS 7009	42.850534°S 147.298736°E		23 October 1950		26m x 56m
Glenorchy Ice Skating Rink	327 Main Road, Glenorchy TAS 7010	42.833561°S 147.280589°E	100	1981	May 2022	30m x 15m
Victoria
Melbourne Glaciarium	16 City Road, South Melbourne VIC 3205	37.820542°S 144.966871°E	2000	9 June 1906	1957	55m x 27m
Iceland Ringwood	Maroondah Highway, Ringwood, Victoria, 3132	37.820542°S 144.966871°E	2000	1971	2005	60m x 30m
St. Moritz Ice Rink	16 The Esplanade, St. Kilda, Victoria, 3182	37.865301°S 144.974746°E	2000	10 March 1939	Closed early 1982	
Iceland Footscray	109 Hyde Street, Footscray, Victoria, 3011			1978	1986	
Dandenong Coliseum				1977	1987	
Bendigo Ice Skating Stadium	60-64 Hattam Street, Golden Square, Victoria, 3555	36.781393°S 144.261062°E		1986	2010	
Eastern Ice Skating Centre	Jersey Road, Bayswater, Victoria, 3153	37.842372°S 145.279375°E		2004	2005	
Geelong Ice Arena	37-39 Separation Street, North Geelong, VIC, 3215	38.111188°S 144.346196°E		2000	2005	
Western Australia
Perth Ice Palais	32 Beaufort Street, Northbridge WA 6000	31.950759°S 115.861927°E		14 December 1949	2 February 1952	29m x 26m
Premier Ice Rink - Perth	291-293 Stirling Street, Perth WA 6000	31.942719°S 115.868111°E		1963	1982	
Skates Ice Rink	52 South Terrace, Fremantle WA 6160	32.055824°S 115.748472°E		1970's	1990's	
Cockburn Ice Arena	239 Barrington Street, Bibra Lake WA 6163	32.115009°S 115.814579°E		December 1995	2015 (move to new facility)	
Xtreme Ice Arena	15 Chesterfield Rd, Mirrabooka WA 6061	31.868769°S 115.856147°E		30 November 2010	23 April 2020	

== Proposed venues ==
Proposed permanent indoor ice skating venues in Australia.

Arena	Address	Coordinates	Capacity	Opens	Surface
Australian Capital Territory
Canberra Arena	Rowland Rees Crescent, Greenway ACT 2900	35.424129°S 149.066155°E	3600	CANCELLED	60m x 30m (secondary rink: 60m x 30m)
New South Wales
Ice Zoo	137A Princes Highway, Wolli Creek NSW 2205	33.935690°S 151.150060°E	400	TBD	60m x 30m
South Australia
Inner North Arena	Corner Main North Road & Philip Highway, Elizabeth SA 5112	34.719821°S 138.672483°E	3900	TBD	60m x 30m
Tasmania
Hobart ice rink	TBD	TBD	TBD	TBD	TBD
Victoria
Australian Ice Sports, Pakenham	270 Bald Hill Road, Pakenham VIC 3810	38.092019°S 145.510773°E	500-800	TBD	61m x 26m

== Cancelled venues ==
Formerly proposed, but cancelled, permanent indoor ice skating venues in Australia.

Arena	Address	Coordinates	Proposed	Cancelled	Notes
New South Wales
Winter Sports World	2 Tench Ave, Jamisontown, NSW 2750	33.759440°S 150.670647°E	2018	2022	Ice rink removed from Winter Sports World proposal.
South Australia
Marion Arena	262a Sturt Road, Marion SA 5043	35.017016°S 138.551227°E	2022	2024	Cancelled due to costing issues.

== See also ==
- List of Australian Football League grounds
- List of Australian cricket grounds
- List of indoor arenas in Australia
- List of National Basketball League (Australia) venues
- List of Australian rugby league stadiums
- List of Australian rugby union stadiums
- List of soccer stadiums in Australia
- List of Oceanian stadiums by capacity
