= List of Australian Football League grounds =

Current Australian Football League grounds in Australia

The Australian Football League has numerous grounds upon which senior VFL/AFL games have been played. This list comprises current grounds in use, former grounds in use (both major and minor), regional pre-season grounds and international grounds.

In accordance with the Laws of Australian football, a ground must be grass, have a length of 135 metres (443 ft) to 185 metres (607 ft) and a width of 110 metres (360 ft) and 155 metres (509 ft). Most Australian rules football grounds are also used for cricket, which is also played on a grassed, oval-shaped ground, and it is commonplace for a ground to be used for football in winter and cricket in summer.

Due to the popularity of Australian rules football, particularly in southern Australia, most of Australia's largest stadiums by capacity are used for Australian rules football; and it is therefore common to use those stadiums for other high-drawing events, particularly sporting events. Sports such as rugby and soccer can be readily played on an Australian rules football arena, as their rectangular fields are small enough to be set on the larger oval.

The oldest Australian Football League ground is the Melbourne Cricket Ground. The ground was built in 1854 and is still used for hosting AFL matches, including each year's grand final. The ground also has the largest capacity, at 100,024. The ground that made its most recent AFL debut is Hands Oval in South Bunbury, Western Australia, which hosted its first match during the 2025 season.

As of 2025, 52 different venues have hosted VFL/AFL premiership matches since the league was established in 1897.

== AFL/VFL premiership season venues ==
=== Current grounds ===
The following table shows a list of all of grounds that are currently regularly used in the Australian Football League, as of the 2025 AFL season. The table includes grounds where teams have commercial deals in place to transfer home games to these grounds each season but are not full-time tenants of those grounds; in these cases, the club is shown in italics in the current tenants column.

Current Australian Football League grounds
Ground	Image	Other/sponsored names	City	State/territory	Capacity	First used	Games	Current tenant(s)
Melbourne Cricket Ground	Melbourne Cricket Ground	MCG The 'G	Melbourne	Victoria	100,024	1897	3151	Collingwood; Hawthorn; Melbourne; Richmond; Essendon; Carlton St Kilda
Perth Stadium	Perth Stadium	Optus Stadium (2018–present)	Perth	Western Australia	61,266	2018	181	West Coast; Fremantle
Docklands Stadium	Docklands Stadium	Colonial Stadium (2000–2002); Telstra Dome (2003–2008); Etihad Stadium (2009–2018); Marvel Stadium (2018–present)	Melbourne	Victoria	56,347	2000	1159	Essendon; North Melbourne; St Kilda; Western Bulldogs; Carlton
Adelaide Oval	Adelaide Oval		Adelaide	South Australia	53,583	1877 (Note: Adelaide Oval hosted its first AFL match in round 24 of the 2011 season as a Port Adelaide home game against Melbourne. The ground was redeveloped and has hosted all Adelaide Crows and Port Adelaide Power home games from the 2014 season onwards, replacing Football Park.)	291	Adelaide; Port Adelaide
Sydney Cricket Ground	Sydney Cricket Ground	SCG	Sydney	New South Wales	48,000	1903	474	Sydney
The Gabba	The Gabba	Brisbane Cricket Ground	Brisbane	Queensland	42,000	1981	421	Brisbane
Kardinia Park	Kardinia Park	Shell Stadium (1999–2001); Baytec Stadium (2002 pre-season); Skilled Stadium (2002–2011); Simonds Stadium (2012–2017); GMHBA Stadium (2017–present)	Geelong	Victoria	40,000	1941	730	Geelong
Carrara Stadium	Carrara Stadium	Metricon Stadium (2011–2022); Heritage Bank Stadium (2023); People First Stadium (2024–present)	Gold Coast	Queensland	25,000 (Note: Redevelopment for the 2018 Commonwealth Games.)	1987	255	Gold Coast
Sydney Showground Stadium	Sydney Showground Stadium	Škoda Stadium (2012–2013); Spotless Stadium (2014–2018); GIANTS Stadium (2019–2023); ENGIE Stadium (2024–present)	Sydney	New South Wales	23,500	2012	111	Greater Western Sydney
Bellerive Oval	Bellerive Oval	Blundstone Arena (2012–2024); Ninja Stadium (2024-present)	Hobart	Tasmania	19,500	2012	42	Richmond; Tasmania Football Club
York Park	York Park	Aurora Stadium (2004–2016); University of Tasmania Stadium (2017–present)	Launceston	Tasmania	15,615	2001	96	Hawthorn (Note: The club is not a full-time tenant of the ground, but has a commercial deal in place to play home games at the venue.); Tasmania Football Club
Manuka Oval	Manuka Oval	StarTrack Oval Canberra (2013–2016); UNSW Canberra Oval (2017–2024); Corrobbee Group Oval (2025–present)	Canberra	ACT	15,000	1998	65	Greater Western Sydney
Marrara Oval	Marrara Oval	TIO Stadium (2006–present)	Darwin	Northern Territory	12,000	2004	30	Gold Coast
Eureka Stadium		Mars Stadium (2017–present)	Ballarat	Victoria	11,000	2017	15	Western Bulldogs
Traeger Park	Traeger Park	TIO Traeger Park	Alice Springs	Northern Territory	10,000	2014	11	Melbourne
Hands Oval		JE Hands Memorial Park	South Bunbury	Western Australia	8,000	2025	1	North Melbourne

=== Future or proposed AFL venues ===
Stadium	City	State/Territory	Capacity	Tenants	Opening Date
Macquarie Point Stadium	Hobart	Tasmania	23,000	Tasmania Football Club	2031
Brisbane Stadium	Brisbane	Queensland	63,000	Brisbane Lions	2032

=== Former major grounds ===
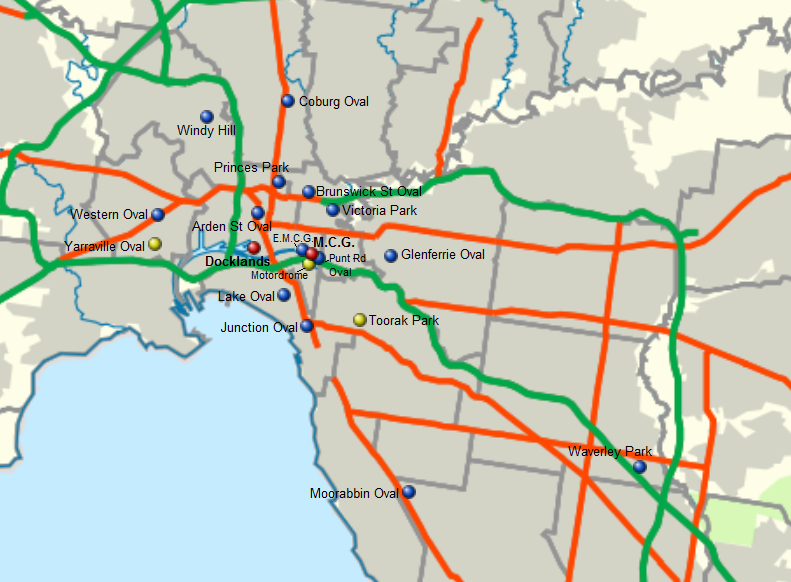
Current and former VFL/AFL venues in metropolitan Melbourne. Current venues shown in red; former major venues shown in blue; other venues shown in yellow.

The following table comprises a list of former grounds that were at one stage the primary home ground, or a long-term secondary home ground, for a club to play its VFL/AFL matches on.

Most of the grounds were the original homes of current teams (for example, Arden Street Oval was North Melbourne's home ground) and have ceased hosting VFL/AFL matches, usually due to location and lack of capacity. Princes Park was the last of the Victorian suburban venues to host an AFL game, with the last match occurring in 2005. These grounds now usually serve as a boutique training oval and administrative base for these AFL clubs, and some are used for underage, VFL, AFL Women's, or suburban league matches.

Waverley Park (originally known as VFL Park), located in Mulgrave, Victoria was the first purpose-built stadium for VFL/AFL matches, opening in 1970. Until the 1990s, it did not serve as any team's home ground, but was instead a neutral venue to which each club shifted one or two of its home matches each year; in the 1990s, it was adopted as a home ground by Hawthorn and St Kilda. Original plans called for the ground's capacity to be 155,000, which would have made it one of the largest stadiums in the world. The venue, with its planned higher capacity, was originally to be a replacement for the Melbourne Cricket Ground as host of the VFL's Grand Final. However, in 1982/1983, when the extensions to finish the original plans were due to commence, the Government of Victoria refused to approve the plans for the stadium because the upgrade would have threatened the Melbourne Cricket Ground's right to host the Grand Final: hence, no further development ever occurred and the capacity was set at 78,000. It was used until 1999, and was replaced by the Docklands Stadium.

Football Park, which was located in West Lakes, Adelaide, had a similar history to Waverley Park; it was purpose built for South Australian National Football League (SANFL) games and opened in 1974, replacing Adelaide Oval as the primary venue for the league: unlike Waverley Park, it became the venue for SANFL Grand Finals. It was the primary South Australian venue for VFL/AFL matches from 1991 (when the league expanded into Adelaide) until 2013, and it was replaced by the newly refurbished Adelaide Oval.

Ground	Other/sponsored names	City	State	Capacity	Games	First used	Last used	Tenant(s)
Arden Street Oval	North Melbourne Recreation Reserve	North Melbourne	Victoria	35,000	529	1925	1985	North Melbourne
Brunswick Street Oval	Fitzroy Cricket Ground	North Fitzroy	Victoria	10,000	612	1897	1966	Fitzroy
Coburg City Oval		Coburg	Victoria	36,000	9	1965	1965	North Melbourne
Corio Oval		Geelong	Victoria	25,000	371	1897	1940	Geelong
East Melbourne Cricket Ground		East Melbourne	Victoria	18,000	225	1897	1921	Essendon: 1897–1921; University: 1908–1910
Football Park	AAMI Stadium (2002–2015)	West Lakes	South Australia	51,240	458	1991	2015 (Note: Adelaide and Port Adelaide played regular season matches at Football Park until the end of the 2013 season, but a NAB Challenge match was played at the ground between the two sides in 2015.)	Adelaide; Port Adelaide
Glenferrie Oval		Hawthorn	Victoria	36,000	443	1925	1973	Hawthorn
Junction Oval	St Kilda Cricket Ground	St Kilda	Victoria	47,000	734	1897	1984	St Kilda: 1897–1964; Fitzroy: 1970–1984
Lake Oval	South Melbourne Cricket Ground	Albert Park	Victoria	41,000	704	1897	1981	South Melbourne
Moorabbin Oval	RSEA Park (2019–present)	Moorabbin	Victoria	51,370	254	1965	1992	St Kilda
Princes Park	Optus Oval (1994–2006); MC Labour Park (2007–2008); Visy Park (2009–2015); Ikon Park (2015–Present)	Carlton	Victoria	62,986	1,277	1897	2005	Carlton: 1897–2005; Fitzroy: 1967–1969, 1987–1993; Hawthorn: 1974–1991; South Melbourne: 1942–1943; Western Bulldogs: 1997–1999
Punt Road Oval	Richmond Cricket Ground meBank Centre (2011–2016); Swinburne Centre (2017–present)	Richmond	Victoria	46,000	544	1908	1964	Richmond: 1908–1964; Melbourne: 1942–1946, 1956
Stadium Australia	Telstra Stadium (2002–2007); ANZ Stadium (2008–2016)	Sydney Olympic Park	New South Wales	82,500	56	2002	2022	Sydney
Subiaco Oval	Patersons Stadium (2011–2014); Domain Stadium (2015–2017)	Perth	Western Australia	42,922	545	1987	2017	West Coast: 1987–2017; Fremantle: 1995–2017
Victoria Park		Abbotsford	Victoria	47,000	880	1897	1999	Collingwood: 1897–1999; Fitzroy: 1985–1986
WACA Ground		East Perth	Western Australia	35,000	72	1987	2000	West Coast: 1987–2000; Fremantle: 1995–2000
Waverley Park	VFL Park (1970–1991)	Mulgrave	Victoria	78,000 92,935*	732	1970	1999	Central ground: 1970–1991; Hawthorn: 1992–1999; St Kilda: 1993–1999
Western Oval	Whitten Oval	West Footscray	Victoria	42,354	665	1925	1997	Footscray: 1925, 1941, 1943–1997; Fitzroy: 1994–1996
Windy Hill	Essendon Recreation Reserve	Essendon	Victoria	43,487	629	1922	1991	Essendon

=== Other minor grounds ===
Minor grounds have been used in the VFL/AFL, but only sparingly. In addition to former commercial deals to sell home games which are no longer active, there have been two main reasons historically for this:

- For promotional events. Prominent examples of this include Gather Round and National Day Round.
- Due to unavailability of primary home grounds. In particular, minor grounds were also used throughout World War II, as some of the larger grounds throughout Victoria were being occupied by servicemen.

Number of times used is correct to September 2025.

Ground	City	State/Country	Capacity	Games	Last used	Uses
Albury Oval	Albury	New South Wales	8,000	1	1952	National Day Round 1952
Barossa Park	Lyndoch	South Australia	10,000	2	2025	Gather Round 2025
Blacktown International Sportspark	Sydney	New South Wales	10,000	1	2012	GWS vs West Coast: used for GWS' inaugural home match before the Showground Stadium was complete
Brisbane Exhibition Ground	Brisbane	Queensland	25,490	1	1952	National Day Round 1952
Bruce Stadium	Canberra	Australian Capital Territory	25,000	1	1995	Fitzroy vs West Coast: round 9, 1995
Cazalys Stadium	Cairns	Queensland	13,500	14	2022	One game per year from 2011–2022 under various deals Four games during 2022 COVID-19 pandemic
Euroa Oval	Euroa	Victoria	7,500	1	1952	National Day Round 1952
Jiangwan Stadium	Shanghai	China	11,000	3	2019	Port Adelaide: one game per year from 2017–19 (Note: The club was not a full-time tenant of the ground, but had a commercial deal in place to play home games at the venue.)
Motordrome	Melbourne	Victoria	30 000	3	1932	Melbourne: three home games in early 1932 when MCG was being resurfaced.
North Hobart Oval	Hobart	Tasmania	18,000	5	1992	National Day Round 1952; Fitzroy: two home games in each of 1991 and 1992
Norwood Oval	Norwood	South Australia	10,000	6	2025	Gather Round 2023, 2024, 2025
Riverway Stadium	Townsville	Queensland	10,000	1	2019	Gold Coast vs St Kilda, round 13 2019
Summit Sport and Recreation Park	Mount Barker	South Australia	7,329	3	2024	Gather Round 2023, 2024
Toorak Park	Melbourne	Victoria	15,000	13	1942–43	St Kilda: home games for the 1942 and 1943 seasons South Melbourne: occasional home games during World War II
Wellington Regional Stadium	Wellington	New Zealand	36,000	3	2013–15	St Kilda: one home game each year from 2013 to 2015
Yarraville Oval	Melbourne	Victoria	10,000	7	1942	Footscray: home games for the 1942 VFL season.
Yallourn Oval	Yallourn	Victoria	3,500	1	1952	National Day Round 1952

== Pre-season venues ==
The following list, is a list of the venues that have been used in AFL pre-season competition.

Many of the grounds were used in the Regional Challenge stage of the AFL pre-season competition, NAB Cup, which was used to bring AFL games to regional centres of South Australia, New South Wales, Queensland, Tasmania, Australian Capital Territory, Northern Territory, Western Australia and Victoria.

Ground	City	State	Capacity	Pre-season series
Centenary Oval	Port Lincoln	South Australia	7,500	2005, 2015
Richmond Oval	Richmond	South Australia	9,000	2014, 2017
Narrandera Sportsground	Narrandera	New South Wales	14,000	2007, 2008, 2010, 2017
Noarlunga Oval	Noarlunga Downs	South Australia	10,000	2008, 2017
Collingwood Park	Albany	Western Australia	8,000	2008
Deakin Reserve	Shepparton	Victoria	10,000	2004, 2008
Casey Fields	Cranbourne	Victoria	9,000	2008, 2017
Blue Lake Sports Park	Mount Gambier	South Australia	8,000	2007
Quandong Park	Red Cliffs	Victoria	10,000	2006, 2007
Queen Elizabeth Oval	Bendigo	Victoria	10,000	2005, 2006, 2008, 2017
Morwell Recreation Reserve	Morwell	Victoria	10,000	2004, 2005, 2010, 2015, 2019
Arena Joondalup	Joondalup	Western Australia	16,000	2005, 2014, 2018, 2019, 2020
Fremantle Oval	Fremantle	Western Australia	10,000	2006, 2015
Rushton Park	Mandurah	Western Australia	10,000	2005, 2014, 2015, 2017, 2019, 2020
Lathlain Park	Lathlain	Western Australia	6,500	2020
Leederville Oval	Leederville	Western Australia	10,000	2006
Lavington Sports Ground	Albury	New South Wales	12,000	2005, 2006, 2017
Newcastle Number 1 Sports Ground	Newcastle	New South Wales	15,000	2004, 2006
North Sydney Oval	North Sydney	New South Wales	16,000	2004
Giffin Park	Coorparoo	Queensland	5,000	2004
Coffs Harbour International Stadium	Coffs Harbour	New South Wales	20,000	2003, 2015, 2017
Nuriootpa Oval	Nuriootpa	South Australia	8,000	2003
Beachlands Oval	Geraldton	Western Australia	—	2003
Moreton Bay Central Sports Complex	Burpengary	Queensland	6,500	2015, 2016
Wonthella Oval	Geraldton	Western Australia	12,000	2017
Ted Summerton Reserve	Moe	Victoria	7,500	2017
Malseed Park	Mount Gambier	South Australia	7,500	2017
Kingston Twin Ovals	Hobart	Tasmania	7,000	2018, 2020
Devonport Oval	Devonport	Tasmania	10,000	2022
West Park Oval	Burnie	Tasmania	12,000	1992
North Hobart Oval	Hobart	Tasmania	18,000	1991, 1992, 1996, 1998, 1999, 2000, 2001
Bruce Stadium	Canberra	Australian Capital Territory	25,011	1990, 1991, 1995, 1996, 1997
Maroochydore Multisports Complex	Sunshine Coast	Queensland	5,000	2012, 2014,
Great Barrier Reef Arena	Mackay	Queensland	10,000	2016, 2017, 2019

== International exhibition/pre-season venues ==
The following is a list of all of the international venues where a game of Australian rules football featuring VFL/AFL clubs has been played (in order of year last used). International matches have included pre-season competition matches or postseason exhibition matches. As of the end of 2018, the only international venues to host matches for premiership points are Westpac Stadium, in Wellington, New Zealand; and Adelaide Arena at Jiangwan Stadium, Shanghai, China.

The first international Australian rules football exhibition match was in London in 1916. A team of Australian soldiers stationed in England at the time formed a team to play against a "training group". The game brought a crowd of 3,000 people that even included the Prince of Wales (later King Edward VIII) and King Manuel II of Portugal.

The more recent AFL international matches have been part of the pre-season competition format and been highly successful. Countries that have hosted such matches include: United Arab Emirates, South Africa and the United Kingdom. There are also plans to expand the game further into countries such as India and Japan.

Name of Ground	City	Country	Match Played	Date	Attendance
Ghantoot Polo and Racing Club	Abu Dhabi	United Arab Emirates	Collingwood vs. Adelaide	9 February 2008	6,102
SuperSport Park	Centurion	South Africa	Carlton vs. Fremantle	2 February 2008	3,500 – 5,222 (reports vary)
The Oval	London	United Kingdom	Various matches		
Intramural Field at UCLA	Los Angeles	United States	Sydney vs. North Melbourne	15 January 2006	3,200
Westpac Stadium	Wellington	New Zealand	Brisbane vs. Adelaide	17 February 2001	7,500
Westpac Stadium	Wellington	New Zealand	Western Bulldogs vs. Hawthorn	29 January 2000	11,666
Newlands Cricket Ground	Cape Town	South Africa	Brisbane vs. Fremantle	22 February 1998	10,123
Basin Reserve	Wellington	New Zealand	Sydney vs. Melbourne	3 January 1998	7,820
Western Springs Stadium	Auckland	New Zealand	St Kilda vs. Geelong	5 October 1991	8,500
Civic Stadium	Portland, Oregon	United States	Melbourne vs. West Coast	12 October 1990	14,787
Joe Robbie Stadium	Miami	United States	Essendon vs. Hawthorn	14 October 1989	10,069
Joe Robbie Stadium	Miami	United States	Collingwood vs. Geelong	8 October 1988	7,500
SkyDome	Toronto	Canada	Melbourne vs. Geelong	12 October 1989	24,639
Varsity Stadium	Toronto	Canada	Collingwood vs. Hawthorn	16 October 1988	18,500
Yokohama Stadium	Yokohama	Japan	Carlton vs. Hawthorn	3 November 1987	13,000
Yokohama Stadium	Yokohama	Japan	Essendon vs. Hawthorn	25 October 1987	25,000
BC Place	Vancouver	Canada	Melbourne vs. North Melbourne	18 October 1987	7,980
BC Place	Vancouver	Canada	Melbourne vs. Sydney	9 October 1987	32,789
Sir Hubert Murray Stadium	Port Moresby	Papua New Guinea	North Melbourne vs. Papua New Guinea	11 October 1976	8,000
	Athens	Greece	Carlton vs. All Stars	5 November 1972	3,000
	Singapore	Singapore	Carlton vs. All Stars	12 November 1972	8,500
South Pacific Oval	Port Moresby	Papua New Guinea	St Kilda vs. Papua New Guinea	8 October 1969	5,000
Crystal Palace National Sports Centre	London	England	Australia vs. Britain	?, 1967	?
Big Rec Stadium	Los Angeles	United States	Geelong vs. Melbourne	26 October 1963	3,500
	Honolulu	United States	Geelong vs. Melbourne	20 October 1963	1,500
Queen's Club	London	England	Australian Division vs. Training Groups	28 October 1916	3,000

== AFL Women's venues ==
Below are the venues that have been used since the commencement of the AFL Women's competition in 2017.

No.	Ground	City	Host club(s)	Capacity	Years	Pld	GF
1	Princes Park	Melbourne, Victoria	Carlton; Collingwood; Richmond	13,000	2017–current	89	4 (2018, 2023, 2024, 2025)
2	Thebarton Oval	Adelaide, South Australia	Adelaide	15,000	2017	2	—
3	Whitten Oval	Melbourne, Victoria	Western Bulldogs	5,000	2017–2022 (S6), 2023–current	39	—
4	Casey Fields	Melbourne, Victoria	Melbourne	9,000	2017–current	37	—
5	Fremantle Oval	Perth, Western Australia	Fremantle	10,000	2017–current	44	—
6	Blacktown International Sportspark	Sydney, New South Wales	Greater Western Sydney	10,000	2017–2022 (S6), 2023	15	—
7	South Pine Sports Complex	Brisbane, Queensland	Brisbane	3,000	2017–2018	5	—
8	Rushton Park	Mandurah, Western Australia	Fremantle	9,000	2017	1	—
9	Norwood Oval	Adelaide, South Australia	Adelaide	15,000	2017–current	29	—
10	Subiaco Oval	Perth, Western Australia	Fremantle	43,500	2017	1	—
11	Marrara Oval	Darwin, Northern Territory	Adelaide; Essendon; Richmond	12,000	2017–2019, 2024–current	5	—
12	Olympic Park Oval	Melbourne, Victoria	Collingwood	3,000	2017–2018, 2022 (S6)	5	—
13	Manuka Oval	Canberra, Australian Capital Territory	Greater Western Sydney	16,000	2017–current	12	—
14	Carrara Stadium	Gold Coast, Queensland	Brisbane; Gold Coast	25,000	2017–current	33	1 (2017)
15	Drummoyne Oval	Sydney, New South Wales	Greater Western Sydney	6,000	2018–2019	2	—
16	Perth Stadium	Perth, Western Australia	Fremantle	61,266	2018–2022 (S7)	6	—
17	Traeger Park	Alice Springs, Northern Territory	Melbourne	7,200	2018–2020	2	—
18	Ted Summerton Reserve	Moe, Victoria	Collingwood	7,500	2018	1	—
19	Moreton Bay Central Sports Complex	Brisbane, Queensland	Brisbane	8,000	2018–2019, 2022 (S6)	4	—
20	Kardinia Park	Geelong, Victoria	Geelong	40,000	2019–current	36	—
21	North Hobart Oval	Hobart, Tasmania	North Melbourne	18,000	2019–2022 (S6), 2024–current	7	—
22	Victoria Park	Melbourne, Victoria	Collingwood	10,000	2019–current	31	—
23	York Park	Launceston, Tasmania	North Melbourne	19,000	2019–current	7	—
24	Hickey Park	Brisbane, Queensland	Brisbane	5,000	2019–2021	7	—
25	Morwell Recreation Reserve	Morwell, Victoria	Collingwood	12,000	2019–2020	2	—
26	Chirnside Park	Werribee, Victoria	North Melbourne	10,000	2019	1	—
27	Docklands Stadium	Melbourne, Victoria	Collingwood; Western Bulldogs; North Melbourne	52,500	2019–2022 (S7)	5	—
28	Unley Oval	Adelaide, South Australia	Adelaide	10,000	2019, 2022 (S6)–current	12	—
29	Adelaide Oval	Adelaide, South Australia	Adelaide	55,317	2019–2022 (S7)	7	3 (2019, 2021, 2022 (S6))
30	Moorabbin Oval	Melbourne, Victoria	St Kilda	8,000	2020–current	31	—
31	Richmond Oval	Adelaide, South Australia	Adelaide	16,500	2020	3	—
32	Queen Elizabeth Oval	Bendigo, Victoria	Richmond	10,000	2020	1	—
33	Arden Street Oval	Melbourne, Victoria	North Melbourne	5,000	2020–current	20	—
34	Leederville Oval	Perth, Western Australia	West Coast	10,000	2020, 2024–current	4	—
35	Great Barrier Reef Arena	Mackay, Queensland	Gold Coast	10,000	2020, 2022 (S6)–current	6	—
36	Robertson Oval	Wagga Wagga, New South Wales	Greater Western Sydney	10,000	2020	1	—
37	Lathlain Park	Perth, Western Australia	West Coast	6,500	2020–current	26	—
38	Sydney Showground Stadium	Sydney, New South Wales	Greater Western Sydney	24,000	2020–2022 (S6)	2	—
39	Punt Road Oval	Melbourne, Victoria	Richmond	5,000	2021–current	23	—
40	The Gabba	Brisbane, Queensland	Brisbane	39,202	2021–2022 (S7)	4	—
41	Frankston Park	Melbourne, Victoria	St Kilda; Hawthorn	8,000	2022 (S6)–current	18	—
42	Hickinbotham Oval	Adelaide, South Australia	Adelaide	12,000	2022 (S6)	1	—
43	Henson Park	Sydney, New South Wales	Greater Western Sydney; Sydney	30,000	2022 (S6)–current	26	—
44	Maroochydore Multi Sports Complex	Maroochydore, Queensland	Brisbane	5,000	2022 (S6)	2	—
45	Trevor Barker Beach Oval	Melbourne, Victoria	St Kilda	10,000	2022 (S6)	3	—
46	Eureka Stadium	Ballarat, Victoria	Western Bulldogs	11,000	2022 (S6)–current	6	—
47	Melbourne Cricket Ground	Melbourne, Victoria	Melbourne	100,022	2022 (S6)–2024	3	—
48	Glenelg Oval	Adelaide, South Australia	Adelaide	14,000	2022 (S7)	1	—
49	Bellerive Oval	Hobart, Tasmania	North Melbourne	19,500	2022 (S7)–2023	2	—
50	North Sydney Oval	Sydney, New South Wales	Sydney	16,000	2022 (S7)–current	5	—
51	Alberton Oval	Adelaide, South Australia	Port Adelaide	15,000	2022 (S7)–current	22	—
52	North Port Oval	Melbourne, Victoria	Essendon; Melbourne	10,000	2022 (S7)	2	—
53	Box Hill City Oval	Melbourne, Victoria	Hawthorn	10,000	2022 (S7)	2	—
54	Sydney Cricket Ground	Sydney, New South Wales	Sydney	48,000	2022 (S7)	1	—
55	Bond University	Gold Coast, Queensland	Gold Coast	5,000	2022 (S7), 2025	2	—
56	Reid Oval	Warrnambool, Victoria	Essendon	5,000	2022 (S7)–2023	2	—
57	Mildura Sporting Precinct	Mildura, Victoria	Richmond	5,000	2022 (S7)	1	—
58	Springfield Central Stadium	Springfield, Queensland	Brisbane	10,000	2022 (S7)–current	21	1 (2022 (S7))
59	Windy Hill	Essendon, Victoria	Essendon	10,000	2023–current	14	—
60	Cazalys Stadium	Cairns, Queensland	Hawthorn	15,000	2023–current	3	—
61	Coffs Harbour International Stadium	Coffs Harbour, New South Wales	Sydney	10,000	2024–current	2	—

== See also ==
- Lists of stadiums
- List of Australian cricket grounds
- List of ice rinks in Australia
- List of indoor arenas in Australia
- List of National Basketball League (Australia) venues
- List of Australian rugby league stadiums
- List of Australian rugby union stadiums
- List of soccer stadiums in Australia
- List of Oceanian stadiums by capacity
