= List of Australian rugby union stadiums by capacity =

The following article lists stadiums used presently or in the past for rugby union in Australia.

== Overview ==
While these stadiums are occasionally used by rugby union, none except Ballymore could be described as "rugby union grounds" per se. All are used principally for rugby league and/or Australian rules football. Several of these stadiums, primarily those with rectangular fields, are also used for soccer.

Stadiums used by the defunct Australian Rugby Championship and the 2003 Rugby World Cup are included for posterity.

=== Present Grounds ===
Rank	Stadium	City	Image	Use(s)	Capacity
1	ANZ Stadium	Sydney, NSW		2003 Rugby World Cup; Wallabies internationals	82,000
2	Optus Stadium	Perth, WA		2019 Bledisloe Cup	65,000
3	Marvel Stadium	Melbourne, Vic		2003 Rugby World Cup; Wallabies internationals	56,347
4	Suncorp Stadium	Brisbane, Qld		2003 Rugby World Cup; Wallabies internationals Queensland Reds; Brisbane Global Rugby Tens	52,500
5	Sydney Football Stadium	Sydney, NSW		2003 Rugby World Cup; New South Wales Waratahs; Wallabies internationals Australia Sevens (World Rugby Sevens Series, from 2015 to 2016)	45,500
6	AAMI Park	Melbourne, Vic		Melbourne Rebels (Super Rugby); Wallabies internationals	30,050
7	cbus Super Stadium	Gold Coast, Qld		Wallabies internationals Gold Coast Sevens (World Rugby Sevens Series, October 2011 – 2015)	27,690
8	Canberra Stadium	Canberra, ACT		Brumbies; 2003 Rugby World Cup; Canberra Vikings (ARC)	25,011
9	University of Tasmania Stadium	Launceston, Tasmania	A small stand to the left and a two tier stand and scoreboard filled with people in the backdrop of an oval grass playing surface scattered with players. Spectators stand in the foreground.	2003 Rugby World Cup	21,000
10	nib Stadium	Perth, WA		Perth Spirit (ARC); Western Force (2010–present)	20,500
11	North Hobart Oval	Hobart, Tasmania		Melbourne Rebels (2014)	18,000

=== Former Grounds ===
These grounds have been used in the past, but don't host club or international fixtures (used less frequently than once a year).
Demolished stadiums in Italics.

Rank	Stadium	City	Image	Use(s)	Capacity
1	Melbourne Cricket Ground	Melbourne, Vic		Wallabies internationals	100,024
2	Adelaide Oval	Adelaide, SA		2003 Rugby World Cup; Adelaide Sevens (IRB Sevens World Series) (2007–April 2011)	53,500
3	Sydney Cricket Ground	Sydney, NSW		Wallabies internationals	48,000
4	Dairy Farmers Stadium	Townsville, Qld		2003 Rugby World Cup; Queensland Reds	26,500
5	Carrara Stadium	Gold Coast, Qld		Queensland Reds (pre-season); East Coast Aces (ARC)	25,000
6	Ballymore Stadium	Brisbane, Qld		Ballymore Tornadoes (ARC); Queensland Reds (APC)	24,000
7	WIN Stadium	Wollongong, NSW		2003 Rugby World Cup	23,000
8	Parramatta Stadium	Parramatta, NSW		Western Sydney Rams (ARC)	21,500
9	Central Coast Stadium	Gosford, NSW		2003 Rugby World Cup; Central Coast Rays (ARC); New South Wales Waratahs APC	20,059
10	Aurora Stadium	Launceston, Tas		2003 Rugby World Cup	21,000
11	North Sydney Oval	Sydney, NSW		Sydney Fleet (ARC)	20,000
12	Concord Oval	Sydney, NSW		West Harbour RFC	20,000
13	Olympic Park Stadium	Melbourne, Vic		Melbourne Rebels (ARC)	18,500
14	Manuka Oval	Canberra, ACT		Canberra Vikings (ARC)	15,000
15	Viking Park	Canberra, ACT		Tuggeranong Vikings (ACT Premiership); Brumbies (APC)	8,000

== National Rugby Championship Stadiums ==
Home match venues for the 2014 NRC season:

State	Team	Match Venue	Capacity	City
ACT	University of Canberra Vikings	Viking Park	10,000	Canberra
NSW	NSW Country Eagles	Caltex Park	12,000	Dubbo
NSW	NSW Country Eagles	Central Coast Stadium	20,059	Gosford
NSW	NSW Country Eagles	Oakes Oval	10,000	Lismore
NSW	NSW Country Eagles	Wade Park	8,000	Orange
NSW	NSW Country Eagles	Coogee Oval	5,000	Sydney
NSW	Greater Sydney Rams	Parramatta Stadium	21,500	Sydney
NSW	North Harbour Rays	Brookvale Oval	23,000	Sydney
NSW	Sydney Stars	Leichhardt Oval	20,000	Sydney
QLD	Brisbane City	Suncorp Stadium	52,500	Brisbane
QLD	Brisbane City	Ballymore	24,000	Brisbane
QLD	Queensland Country	Ballymore	24,000	Brisbane
QLD	Queensland Country	Bond University	5,000	Gold Coast
QLD	Queensland Country	Cbus Super Stadium	27,400	Gold Coast
QLD	Queensland Country	Mike Carney Toyota Park	5,000	Townsville
VIC	Melbourne Rising	AAMI Park	29,500	Melbourne
WA	Perth Spirit	Adelaide Airport Oval	15,000	Adelaide
WA	Perth Spirit	HBF Arena	16,000	Perth
WA	Perth Spirit	Rockingham RUC	3,000	Perth
WA	Perth Spirit	UWA Rugby Club	4,000	Perth

Home match venues for the 2015 NRC season:

State	Team	Match Venue	Capacity	City
ACT	University of Canberra Vikings	Viking Park	10,000	Canberra
NSW	NSW Country Eagles	Ann Ashwood Park		Bathurst
NSW	NSW Country Eagles	No. 2 Sports Ground		Newcastle
NSW	NSW Country Eagles	Chillingworth Oval		Tamworth
NSW	NSW Country Eagles	Woollahra Oval	5,000	Sydney
NSW	Greater Sydney Rams	Concord Oval	20,000	Sydney
NSW	Greater Sydney Rams	Granville Park	5,000	Sydney
NSW	Greater Sydney Rams	Forshaw Park	3,000	Sydney
NSW	Greater Sydney Rams	Parramatta Stadium	21,500	Sydney
NSW	North Harbour Rays	Manly Oval	5,000	Sydney
NSW	North Harbour Rays	Pittwater Park	10,000	Sydney
NSW	Sydney Stars	Leichhardt Oval	20,000	Sydney
QLD	Brisbane City	Ballymore	24,000	Brisbane
QLD	Queensland Country	Bond University	5,000	Gold Coast
QLD	Queensland Country	Rugby Park	5,000	Rockhampton
QLD	Queensland Country	Sports Ground	9,000	Toowoomba
QLD	Queensland Country	Stockland Park	12,000	Sunshine Coast
VIC	Melbourne Rising	Ashwood Reserve	3,000	Melbourne
VIC	Melbourne Rising	Frankston Park	8,000	Melbourne
VIC	Melbourne Rising	Simonds Stadium	34,074	Geelong
VIC	Melbourne Rising	Latrobe City Stadium	12,000	Morwell
WA	Perth Spirit	UWA Rugby Club	4,000	Perth

== See also ==
- List of rugby union stadiums by capacity
- List of English rugby union stadiums by capacity
- List of Super Rugby stadiums
- List of rugby union stadiums in France
- List of Australian Football League grounds
- List of Australian cricket grounds
- List of ice rinks in Australia
- List of indoor arenas in Australia
- List of National Basketball League (Australia) venues
- List of Australian rugby league stadiums
- List of soccer stadiums in Australia
- List of Oceanian stadiums by capacity
