= Brisbane Live =

Proposed entertainment venue in Brisbane, Australia

Brisbane Arena
- Interactive map of Brisbane Arena
- Location: Brisbane, Queensland, Australia
- Coordinates: 27.485150°S 153.034267°E
- Capacity: 17,000 (seated)

Construction
- Groundbreaking: 2027
- Opened: April 2031 (planned)
- Cost: AU$1.4 billion (US$948 million)
- Project managers: Gather Brisbane (Live Nation Entertainment, Oak View Group, Plenary Group)
- General contractor: Webuild

Brisbane Arena, formerly known as Brisbane Live, is a proposed multipurpose entertainment and sporting arena that would be located within the Woolloongabba Cross River Rail site in the southern area of Brisbane, Queensland, Australia. The venue was originally the planned location for swimming and water polo events at the 2032 Summer Olympics and the 2032 Summer Paralympics, but the events have since been moved to the upcoming National Aquatics Centre, leaving the Brisbane Arena's use for the Games currently unknown.

== Location ==
The arena was originally going to be located in a new precinct, situated above existing railway lines, directly east of Roma Street railway station. The arena precinct was to be situated between Roma Street and Albert Street, linking with the railway station and Roma Street Parkland to the west. The site was partially occupied by the now demolished Brisbane Transit Centre.

In March 2024, the Premier of Queensland, Steven Miles, announced that the Brisbane Live arena would be relocated to the Roma Street Parkland, rather than be built above the Roma Street railway station.

On 21 March 2025, a journalist of Nine News Queensland, Tim Arvier, revealed that the government of Queensland was planning to scrap Brisbane Live in favour of building an aquatic centre, so that the funds for building the venue would go towards the construction of a new stadium in Victoria Park. He also revealed that the 100-day review had prior recommended Brisbane Live be scrapped as an Olympic venue and would continue as a standalone "market-led" project without federal funding. The arena would be moved to Woolloongabba and be built across from The Gabba.

In November 2026, the Queensland Government selected a consortium to manage the entire project. They also announced construction would start in early 2027, with targeted completion by April 2031.

== See also ==
- List of indoor arenas in Australia
- Venues of the 2032 Summer Olympics and Paralympics
