= List of Oceanian stadiums by capacity =

The following is an incomplete list of sports stadiums in Oceania. They are ordered by their capacity, that is the maximum number of spectators the stadium can accommodate.

Oceanian stadiums with a capacity of 30,000 or more are included. The majority of these are in Australia, with the remainder in New Zealand.

Most large stadiums in Oceania are used for cricket, Australian Football, rugby union, rugby league, and association football.

== List ==
Rank	Stadium	Capacity	City	Country	Tenants	Image
1	Melbourne Cricket Ground	100,024	Melbourne	Australia	Melbourne FC, Richmond FC, Collingwood FC, Victorian Bushrangers, Melbourne Stars, Hawthorn FC, Essendon FC, Carlton FC, Australia national rugby union team and Australia national soccer team matches, mainly used for Australia national cricket team for Test Cricket, One Day International and Twenty20 matches	
2	Accor Stadium	83,500	Sydney	Australia	South Sydney DRLFC, Canterbury Bulldogs, New South Wales Blues, Australia national rugby league team, Australia national rugby union team, and Australia national soccer team	
3	Optus Stadium	61,266	Perth	Australia	Fremantle Dockers, Perth Scorchers, West Coast Eagles, Australia national cricket team matches, Australia national rugby union team matches, and Perth Glory	
4	Adelaide Oval	56,000	Adelaide	Australia	Southern Redbacks, Australia national cricket team for Test Cricket and One Day International, Twenty20 matches, Adelaide Crows, Port Adelaide Power, SANFL and Adelaide Strikers	
5	Marvel Stadium	53,359	Melbourne	Australia	St Kilda Football Club, Carlton Football Club, Essendon Football Club, North Melbourne Football Club, Western Bulldogs, Melbourne Victory, Australia national rugby union team matches and Melbourne Renegades	
6	Suncorp Stadium	52,500	Brisbane	Australia	Brisbane Broncos, Queensland Maroons, Queensland Reds, Australia national rugby league team and Australia national rugby union team	
7	Eden Park	50,000	Auckland	New Zealand	Auckland Rugby Football Union, Blues, some New Zealand national rugby union team, New Zealand national soccer team, Auckland Aces and New Zealand national cricket team for Test Cricket and One Day International and Twenty20 matches	
8	Queensland Sport and Athletics Centre Stadium	48,500	Brisbane	Australia	Queensland Athletics. Formerly used by the Brisbane Broncos and Queensland Maroons for rugby league. Main athletics venue for the 1982 Commonwealth Games (as Queen Elizabeth II Jubilee Sports Centre) and the 2001 Goodwill Games (as ANZ Stadium.)	
9	Sydney Cricket Ground	48,000	Sydney	Australia	Mainly used for Australian national cricket team for Test Cricket, One Day International and Twenty20 matches, home ground for New South Wales Blues and Sydney Sixers, Eastern Suburbs DRLFC, New South Wales rugby league team, Sydney Swans	
10	Allianz Stadium	45,000	Sydney	Australia	Eastern Suburbs DRLFC, Sydney FC, New South Wales Waratahs	
11	Brisbane Cricket Ground	42,000	Brisbane	Australia	Australian national cricket team for Test Cricket, One Day International and Twenty20 matches, Brisbane Heat, Queensland Bulls, Brisbane Lions	
12	GMHBA Stadium	40,000	Geelong	Australia	Geelong Cats	
13	Hnry Stadium	34,500	Wellington	New Zealand	Hurricanes, Wellington Rugby Football Union, Wellington Phoenix FC, some New Zealand national rugby union team matches, New Zealand national cricket team for One Day International and Twenty20 matches	
14	McDonald Jones Stadium	33,000	Newcastle	Australia	Newcastle Knights, Newcastle Jets	
15	Forsyth Barr Stadium	30,748	Dunedin	New Zealand	Highlanders, Otago Rugby Football Union, Otago United, some New Zealand national rugby union team matches	
16	AAMI Park	30,050	Melbourne	Australia	Melbourne Storm, Melbourne Rebels, Melbourne Victory FC, Melbourne City FC	
17	Mt. Smart Stadium	30,000	Auckland	New Zealand	New Zealand Warriors, Counties Manukau Rugby Union	
18	CommBank Stadium	30,000	Sydney	Australia	Parramatta Eels, Western Sydney Wanderers FC, some Wests Tigers, Canterbury-Bankstown Bulldogs, South Sydney DRLFC and New South Wales Waratahs matches	

== See also ==
- List of African stadiums by capacity
- List of Asian stadiums by capacity
- List of European stadiums by capacity
- List of North American stadiums by capacity
- List of South American stadiums by capacity
- List of association football stadiums by country
- Lists of stadiums
- Sport in Oceania
