= 2009–10 LFL season =

- Duration: September 4, 2009 – January 29, 2010
- Eastern Champions champions: Chicago Bliss
- Western Champions champions: Los Angeles Temptation

Lingerie Bowl VII
- Date: February 6, 2010
- Venue: Seminole Hard Rock Live Arena, Hollywood, Florida
- Champions: Los Angeles Temptation

Seasons
- 2010–11

The 2009–10 LFL Season was the inaugural season of the Lingerie Football League. The league was formed from a concept called the Lingerie Bowl, that was featured during half-time of the Super Bowl. The season featured 10 teams in cities across the United States. The season kicked off on September 4, 2009, and culminated with Lingerie Bowl VII on February 7, 2010. The championship game, scheduled to coincide with Super Bowl XLIV, was held at the Seminole Hard Rock Hotel and Casino in Hollywood, Florida. The Western Conference Los Angeles Temptation defeated the Eastern Conference Chicago Bliss by the score of 27–14.

The games were released on DVD in Australia by FuelTV, who aired the games in Australia. The games were divided into three sets, labeled Western, Eastern, and Playoffs.

== Teams ==
When the operators of the Lingerie Bowl announced the formation of a full season league in September 2008, they included the names of ten teams for the 2009–10 season: the Atlanta Steam, Chicago Bliss, Dallas Desire, Los Angeles Temptation, Miami Caliente, New England Euphoria, Phoenix Scorch, San Diego Seduction, Seattle Mist, and the Tampa Breeze. Four of the teams (Los Angeles, Miami, Phoenix, and Tampa) were to take part in the 2009 Lingerie Bowl, but it was cancelled due to venue issues. By February 2009, the Euphoria were removed and the league was listing 11 possible team locations by adding Charlotte, North Carolina, and Denver, Colorado. The league then added the New York Majesty and Philadelphia Passion as teams, while the teams in Atlanta, Charlotte, and Phoenix never launched. The Majesty were originally scheduled with the intentions of using Nassau Veterans Memorial Coliseum on Long Island, New York, for its two home games, but failed to secure the lease leading to its first home game being postponed. The team eventually scheduled home games over 100 miles from New York City in Reading, Pennsylvania.

Eastern Conference	Location	Venue
Chicago Bliss	Hoffman Estates, Illinois	Sears Centre
Miami Caliente	Sunrise, Florida	BankAtlantic Center
New York Majesty	Reading, Pennsylvania	Sovereign Center
Philadelphia Passion	Trenton, New Jersey	Sun National Bank Center (Note: Venue was renamed from Sovereign Bank Arena to Sun National Bank Center on November 13, 2009, during the season.)
Tampa Breeze	Tampa, Florida	St. Pete Times Forum
Western Conference	Location	Venue
Dallas Desire	Grand Prairie, Texas	QuikTrip Park
Denver Dream	Commerce City, Colorado	Dick's Sporting Goods Park
Los Angeles Temptation	Los Angeles, California	Los Angeles Memorial Sports Arena; Los Angeles Memorial Coliseum
San Diego Seduction	San Diego, California	San Diego Sports Arena
Seattle Mist	Kent, Washington	ShoWare Center

== Schedule ==
Date	Visitor	Score	Home	Venue
September 4, 2009	Miami Caliente	19–29	Chicago Bliss	Sears Center
September 11, 2009	San Diego Seduction	6–20	Seattle Mist	ShoWare Center
September 18, 2009	Los Angeles Temptation	26–19	Denver Dream	Dick's Sporting Goods Park
September 25, 2009	Denver Dream	6–20	Dallas Desire	QuikTrip Park
~~October 2, 2009~~	Chicago Bliss	Postponed (Note: Rescheduled to November 20 in Reading, Pennsylvania.)	New York Majesty	Nassau Veterans Memorial Coliseum
October 9, 2009	Seattle Mist	28–19	Denver Dream	Dick's Sporting Goods Park
October 16, 2009	Dallas Desire	40–6	San Diego Seduction	San Diego Sports Arena
October 23, 2009	Los Angeles Temptation	12–24	Dallas Desire	QuikTrip Park
October 30, 2009	Philadelphia Passion	40–6	New York Majesty	Sovereign Center
November 6, 2009	Miami Caliente	37–26	Philadelphia Passion	Sovereign Bank Arena
November 13, 2009	New York Majesty	7–49	Miami Caliente	BankAtlantic Center
~~November 20, 2009~~	Chicago Bliss	Cancelled	New York Majesty	Sovereign Center
November 27, 2009	Seattle Mist	20–26	Los Angeles Temptation	Los Angeles Memorial Sports Arena
December 4, 2009	Chicago Bliss	27–18	Tampa Breeze	St. Pete Times Forum
December 11, 2009	Tampa Breeze	6–12	Philadelphia Passion	Sun National Bank Center
December 18, 2009	Philadelphia Passion	19–46	Chicago Bliss	Sears Center
December 25, 2009	Bye week			
January 1, 2010	Dallas Desire	12–28	Seattle Mist	ShoWare Center
~~January 8, 2010~~	Denver Dream	Cancelled (Note: Game was cancelled by the league as the game would not affect the playoff standings and to prevent possible injury to the players.)	San Diego Seduction	San Diego Sports Arena
January 15, 2010	New York Majesty	13–40	Tampa Breeze	St. Pete Times Forum
January 22, 2010	Tampa Breeze	28–18	Miami Caliente	BankAtlantic Center
January 29, 2010	San Diego Seduction	0–53	Los Angeles Temptation	Los Angeles Memorial Coliseum

== Standings ==
=== Eastern Conference ===
Team	Wins	Loss	Ties	Pct	PF	PA	Net Pts	Home	Road
Chicago Bliss*	3	0	0	1.000	102	56	56	2–0	1–0
Miami Caliente*	2	2	0	.500	123	90	33	1–1	1–1
Tampa Breeze	2	2	0	.500	92	70	22	1–1	1–1
Philadelphia Passion	2	2	0	.500	97	95	2	1–1	1–1
New York Majesty	0	3	0	.000	26	126	–103	0–1	0–2

=== Western Conference ===
Team	Wins	Loss	Ties	Pct	PF	PA	Net Pts	Home	Road
Dallas Desire*	3	1	0	.750	96	52	44	2–0	1–1
Los Angeles Temptation*	3	1	0	.750	117	63	54	2–0	1–1
Seattle Mist	3	1	0	.750	96	63	33	2–0	1–1
Denver Dream	0	3	0	.000	44	74	–30	0–2	0–1
San Diego Seduction	0	3	0	.000	12	113	–101	0–1	0–2

* – clinched playoff berth

== Playoffs ==
Date	Visitor	Score	Home	Venue	Recap
Western Conference Championship
February 4, 2010	Los Angeles Temptation (2)	20–14	Dallas Desire (1)	Seminole Hard Rock Live Arena; Miami	Recap
Eastern Conference Championship
February 4, 2010	Miami Caliente (2)	7–20	Chicago Bliss (1)	Seminole Hard Rock Live Arena; Miami	Recap
Lingerie Bowl VII
February 6, 2010	Los Angeles Temptation (W2)	27–14	Chicago Bliss (E1)	Seminole Hard Rock Live Arena; Miami	Recap

== Awards ==
League MVP

- Gabrielle Marie, Dallas Desire

Offensive Player of the Year

- Saran Dunmore, Chicago Bliss

Defensive Player of the Year

- Elizabeth Gorman, Tampa Breeze

Coach of the Year

- Antuan Edwards, Dallas Desire

Mortaza Award

- Erin Marie Garrett, Dallas Desire

Most Improved Player

- Riley Maddex, Los Angeles Temptation
