= Bench-clearing brawl =

Fight involving most players on a sports team

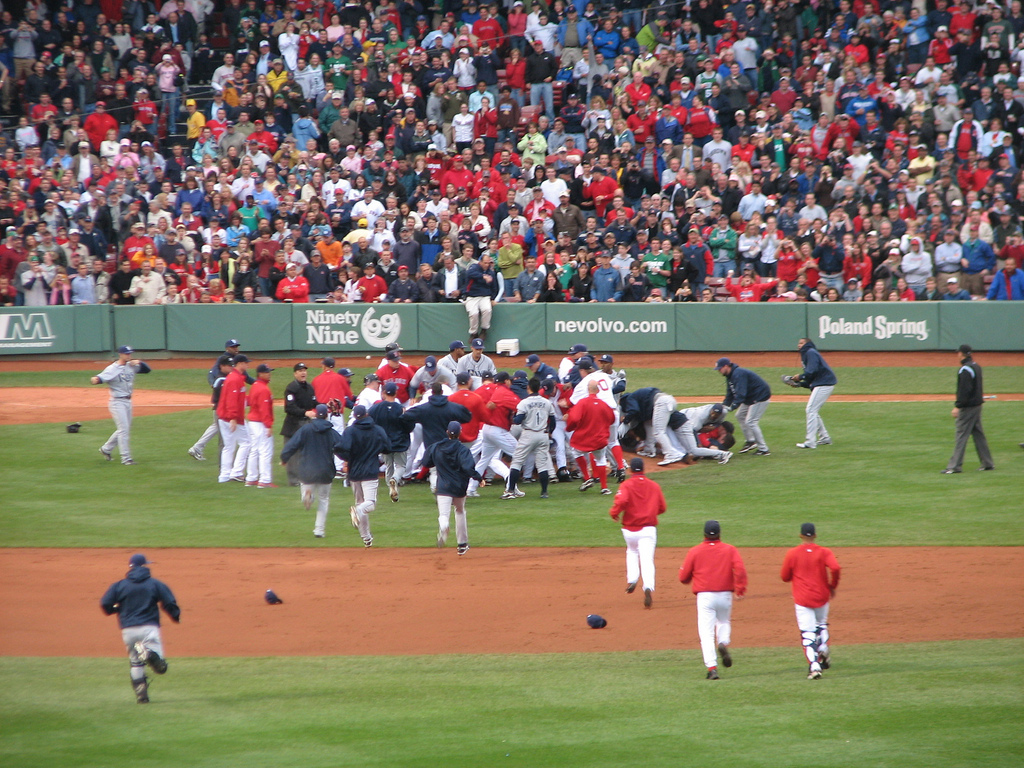
This bench-clearing brawl at Fenway Park in June 2008 began with Boston Red Sox batter Coco Crisp being hit by a pitch from James Shields of the Tampa Bay Rays.

A bench-clearing brawl is a form of fighting that occurs in sports, most notably baseball and ice hockey, where most or all players on both teams leave their dugouts, bullpens, or benches, and charge onto the playing area in order to fight one another or try to break up a fight. Penalties for leaving the bench can range from nothing to severe.

== Baseball ==
In baseball, brawls are usually the result of escalating infractions or indignities, often stemming from a batter being hit by a pitch, especially if the batter then charges the mound. They may also be spurred by an altercation between a baserunner and fielder, such as excessive contact during an attempted tag out.

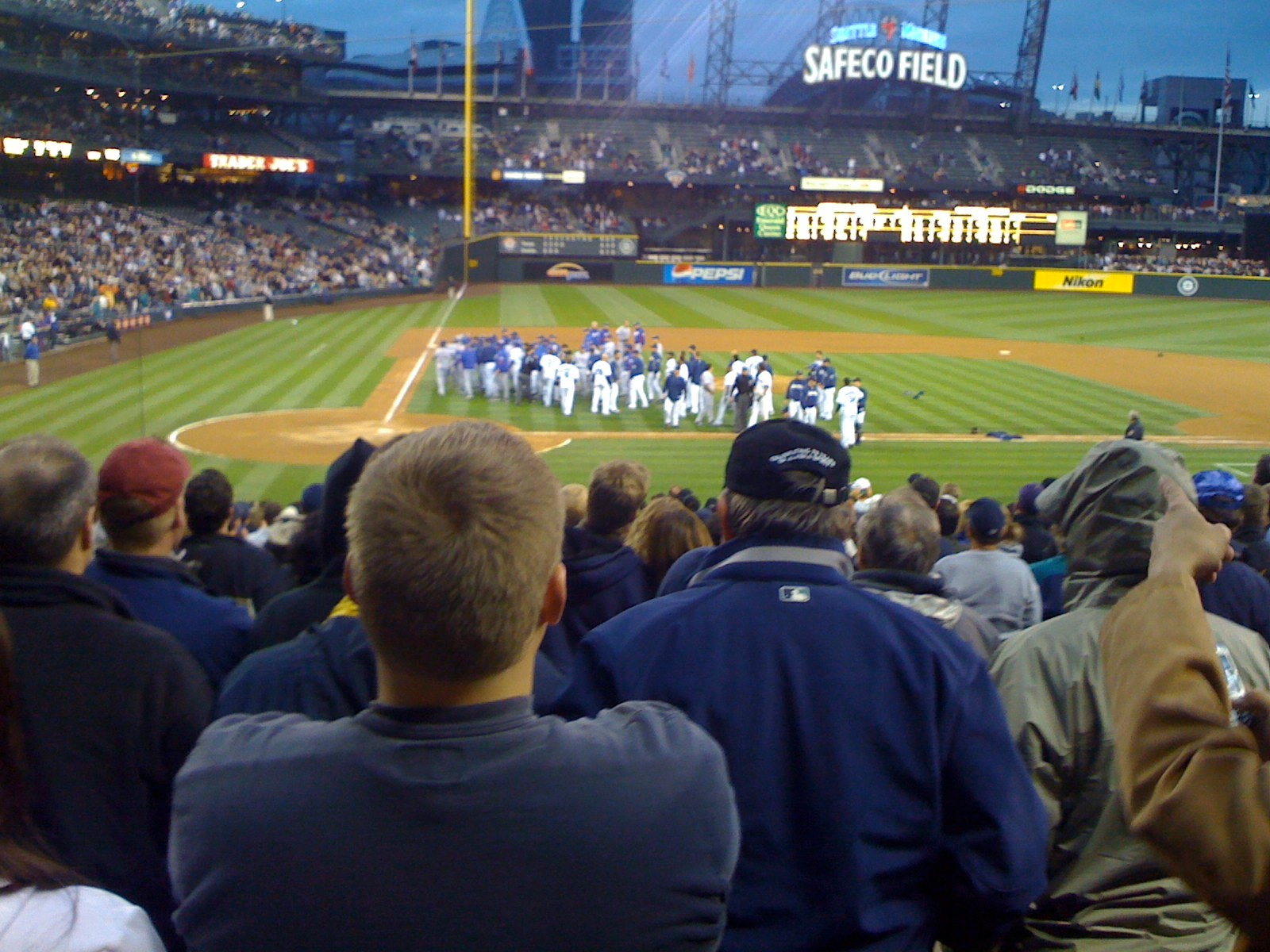
This bench-clearing incident between the Texas Rangers and Seattle Mariners in May 2008 followed a Seattle batter charging the mound.

Few bench-clearing brawls result in serious injury, as in most cases, no punches are thrown, and the action is limited to pushing and shoving. Noteworthy is that players from opposing bullpens run onto the field, often side-by-side, depending on bullpen locations, to join the brawl (which is usually over by the time they arrive), rather than brawling among themselves. This highlights the purpose of coming onto the field which is to show support instead of escalating the conflict.

Unlike most other team sports, where teams usually have an equivalent number of players on the field at any given time, in baseball the hitting team is at a numerical disadvantage, with a maximum of five players (the batter, up to three runners, and an on-deck batter) and two base coaches on the field, compared to the fielding team's nine players. For this reason, leaving the dugout to join a fight is generally considered acceptable in that it results in numerical equivalence on the field, a fairer fight, and a typically neutral outcome. As in most cases, managers and/or umpires will intervene to restore order and resume the game. In at least one case, (the infamous Ten Cent Beer Night promotion) the home team (Cleveland Indians) left their dugout to defend the visiting team (Texas Rangers) from fans who had stormed the field.

=== Penalty ===
Unlike most U.S. sports leagues, Major League Baseball (MLB) does not have a rule specifying a mandatory penalty or ejection for players who leave the bench or bullpen to join in a fight. MLB penalizes fights as unsportsmanlike conduct under its rules. Due to the disparity of as few as one offensive player against nine defensive players on the field, the league is unlikely to modify its rules to ban offensive players from joining brawls. An umpire has the discretion to eject a brawl's participants. Fines and suspensions generally result, and are issued at a later date.

== Ice hockey ==
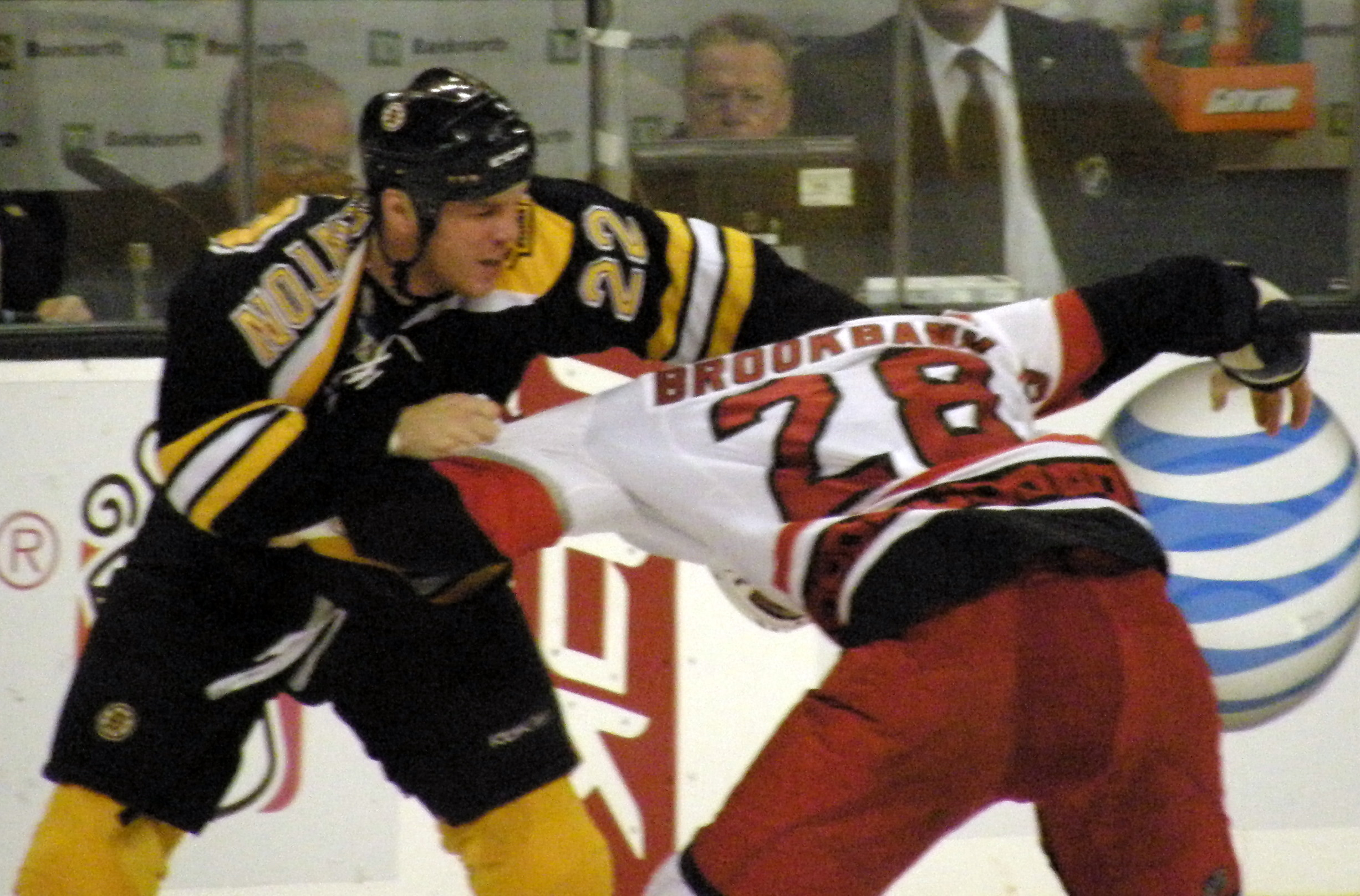
Shawn Thornton fighting Wade Brookbank

Fighting in ice hockey by enforcers is an established, if unofficial, part of the sport (especially in North America, where the penalty rules are more permissive); the general procedure in a one-on-one fight is to let it run to its completion and then send both players to the penalty box with five-minute major penalties. Escalations beyond isolated fights, such as when most or all players on the ice begin to fight, known as a line brawl, are prohibited. Players violating these rules face more serious consequences, such as players being assessed game misconduct penalties (being ejected from the game) and suspensions.

As in baseball, hockey brawls usually result from escalating infractions. In this case, dangerous hits, excessive post-whistle roughness, taking shots after the whistle, attacking the goaltender, and hatred from competition in a game with a significant amount of inter-player violence, all contribute to bench-clearing brawls.

In the National Hockey League the penalties include, in addition to in-game penalties, an automatic 10-game suspension and a fine of $10,000 for the first player to leave his bench or the penalty box to participate in a brawl; for each subsequent player after the first to leave his bench or the penalty box, the penalties include, in addition to in-game penalties, an automatic five-game suspension and a fine of $5,000.

The International Ice Hockey Federation rules prescribe a double minor penalty plus a game misconduct penalty for the first player to leave the bench during an altercation and a misconduct penalty for other such players; a player who leaves the penalty box during an altercation is assessed a minor penalty plus a game misconduct penalty. In addition to these penalties for leaving the bench, all players engaging in a fight may be penalized.

One of the more notable incidents was the Punch-up in Piestany, a game between Canada and the Soviet Union during the 1987 World Junior Ice Hockey Championships. The game was rougher and more dangerous than is generally accepted, and with 6:07 left in the second period, a fight broke out between Pavel Kostichkin and Theoren Fleury, causing both teams to leave the benches for 20 minutes. The officials ordered that the arena lights be turned out, but to no avail, and the IIHF eventually declared the game void. Both teams were ejected from the tournament, costing Canada a potential gold medal, and the Canadian team, disgusted at what they perceived to be a conspiracy against them, chose to leave rather than stay for the end-of-tournament festivities, from which the Soviet team were banned.

A notable KHL bench-clearing brawl saw all the players of Avangard Omsk and Vityaz Chekhov, except for the goaltenders, begin fighting at 3:34 into the first period. The referees ejected 33 players and both teams' coaches before the game was abandoned, as only four players remained; the teams and players were fined a total of 5.6 million rubles ($191,000), with seven players being suspended, and the game was counted as a 5–0 loss for both teams.

== Other sports ==
Bench-clearing brawls have also been known to occur in other sports, and officials in those sports have been cracking down on such brawls. In 1995, the National Basketball Association changed the penalty for leaving the bench to participate in a brawl from a $500 fine to an automatic one-game suspension.

In 2010, the Northern Territory Football League in Australia ruled that any player found to have left the interchange bench to participate in a melee would be ejected from the match. They would also have their melee fine increased by 25% and receive an automatic one-game suspension.

Bench-clearing brawls do not occur very often in gridiron football. All levels of the game penalize any "substitute who leaves the team box during a fight" (as it is worded in the high school rule books) with automatic ejection and possible further sanctions depending on the league, and the amount of equipment a football player wears greatly increases the risk for injury in a brawl. In addition, on-field umpires and referees move in immediately to break up fights, and any contact by a team member against an official will draw the penalty of ejection from the game, with further sanctions by league officials virtually certain. This also includes on-field penalties that move the ball closer or further from the goal line depending on the team sanctioned, hurting the team's winning chances far more than in other sports. One notable brawl at the college level was between the University of Miami and Florida International University, where tough talk between the two crosstown schools escalated into a brawl with severe consequences for FIU. A notable recent bench-clearing brawl in gridiron football occurred after the conclusion of the 2024 edition of “The Game” between the universities of Michigan and Ohio State, after Michigan players attempted to plant their team’s flag on the Ohio State logo at midfield following their victory. The subsequent brawl lasted several minutes, involving dozens of players and required police intervention to break it up, including the police use of pepper spray against the players.

At least two bench-clearing brawls have taken place in the Lingerie Football League, since renamed the Legends Football League. The first came in 2009 between the Miami Caliente and the New York Majesty; that brawl eventually led to the Majesty suspending operations. Another occurred during the December 9, 2011 LFL game between the Toronto Triumph and the Philadelphia Passion. It was unclear what punishment either team would face as Toronto was already using replacement players due to a mass walkout of the original team earlier in the year.

A minor bench-clearing brawl occurred during the 2022 FIFA World Cup in the quarterfinal match between Argentina and The Netherlands, when Argentinian player Leandro Paredes kicked a ball directly into the Dutch bench after fouling Nathan Aké. This resulted in the Dutch players surrounding Paredes which led to a brawl.

=== High school and scholastic sports ===
Bench-clearing brawls are prohibited in scholastic competition with the National Federation of State High School Associations specifying the penalty for leaving the bench area to participate in a fight in any sanctioned sport as an automatic ejection and, if actively involved in a fight, an automatic suspension. In addition, school administrators may implement more severe penalties such as disqualification from activities, academic suspension or expulsion. In more severe instances, participants and coaches can face criminal charges (for example, assault and battery and endangerment of a minor, respectively), and entire schools can face sanctions from their state's athletic association, ranging from letters of reprimand, forfeiture of contests, withholding of travel expenses and extended suspensions of players and coaches to, in the most severe cases, cancellation of a team's entire season, prohibition from participation in state tournaments for a period of time, or suspension of a school's entire athletic program.

== See also ==
- Violence in sports
- The Battle of Candlestick, 1965 brawl between the Dodgers and Giants, lasting 14 minutes
- Good Friday Massacre, 1984 NHL playoff game where two brawls led to 11 ejections and 252 penalty minutes
- 1984 Braves–Padres bean brawl
- Colorado Avalanche–Detroit Red Wings brawl
- The Malice at the Palace, 2004 brawl between the Indiana Pacers, Detroit Pistons, and NBA fans
- Knicks–Nuggets brawl
- Philippines–Australia basketball brawl
- 2011 Crosstown Shootout brawl
