= Violence in sports =

Violent or aggressive acts in sports

Violence in sports usually refers to violent and often unnecessarily harmful intentional physical acts committed during, or motivated by, a sports game, often in relation to contact sports such as American football, ice hockey, rugby football, lacrosse, association football, boxing, mixed martial arts, wrestling, and water polo and, when referring to the players themselves, often involving excessively violent or potentially illegal physical contact beyond the normal levels of contact expected while playing the sport. These acts of violence can include intentional attempts to injure a player or coach by another player or coach, but can also include threats of physical harm or actual physical harm sustained by players or coaches by fans or those engaging in the spectating of sports, or threats and acts of violence performed by fans or spectators upon opposing fans or other spectators.

Forms of violence within sports are often regulated by the relevant sport associations themselves. Some sports are banned or restricted by national or local authorities due to excessive levels of violence.

== Causes ==
There are two major theories on the cause of violence in sports. One theory holds that humans have an instinct for violence, developed during a time when early human ancestors had to resort to violence and aggressiveness to survive and reproduce. Another theory deals with the sociological aspects of violence in sports, stating that sports are "mock battles" which can become actual battles due to their competitive nature.

== Violence by athletes ==
Through a "civilizing process", many modern sports have become less tolerant of bloodshed than past versions, although many violent aspects of these sports still remain.

Athletes sometimes resort to violence, in hopes of injuring and intimidating opponents. Such incidents may be part of a strategy developed by coaches or players.

In boxing, unruly or extremely violent behavior by one of the contestants often results in the fighter breaking the rules being penalized with a points reduction, or, in extreme cases, disqualification. Outlawed tactics in boxing include hitting the opponent on the back of the head, under the belly during clinching, and to the back. Other tactics that are outlawed, but less seen, are pushing an opponent with forceful intent to the floor or ground, kicking, or hitting repeatedly after the round has ended. Similar actions have also happened in ice hockey and Australian Football League matches.

=== Ritual violence ===
High school, college, and even professional sports teams often include initiation ceremonies (known as hazing in the USA) as a rite of passage. A 1999 study by Alfred University and the NCAA found that approximately four out of five college US athletes (250,000 per year) experienced hazing. Half were required to take part in alcohol-related initiations, while two-thirds were subjected to humiliation rituals.

== Fan violence ==
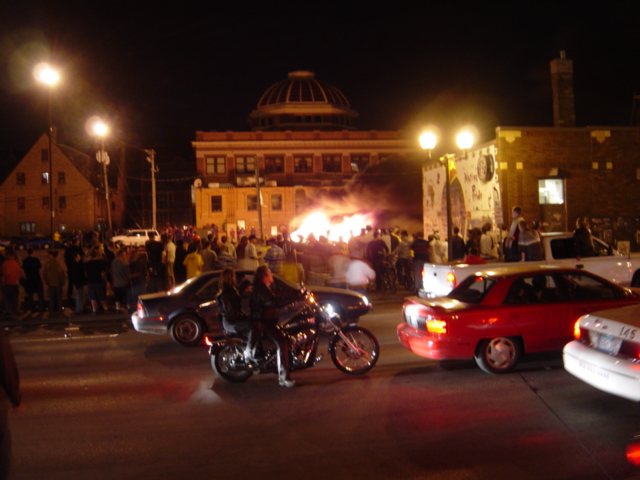
Fans of the Minnesota Golden Gophers riot in the Dinkytown neighborhood of Minneapolis after the Gophers won the 2003 men's Frozen Four

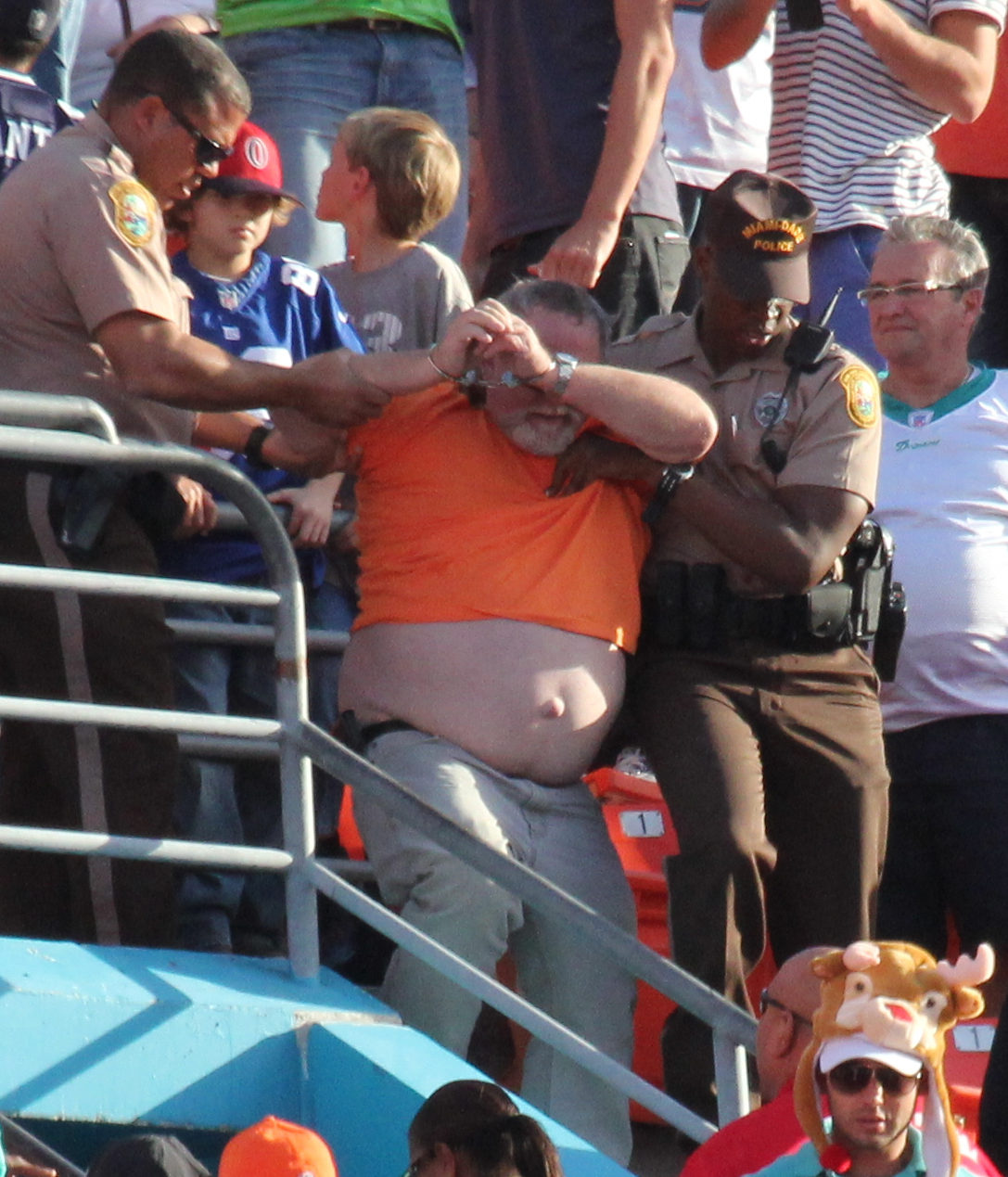
Unruly spectator cuffed and led away by Miami-Dade Police during NFL match between Miami Dolphins and Buffalo Bills at Sun Life Stadium, December 24, 2012.

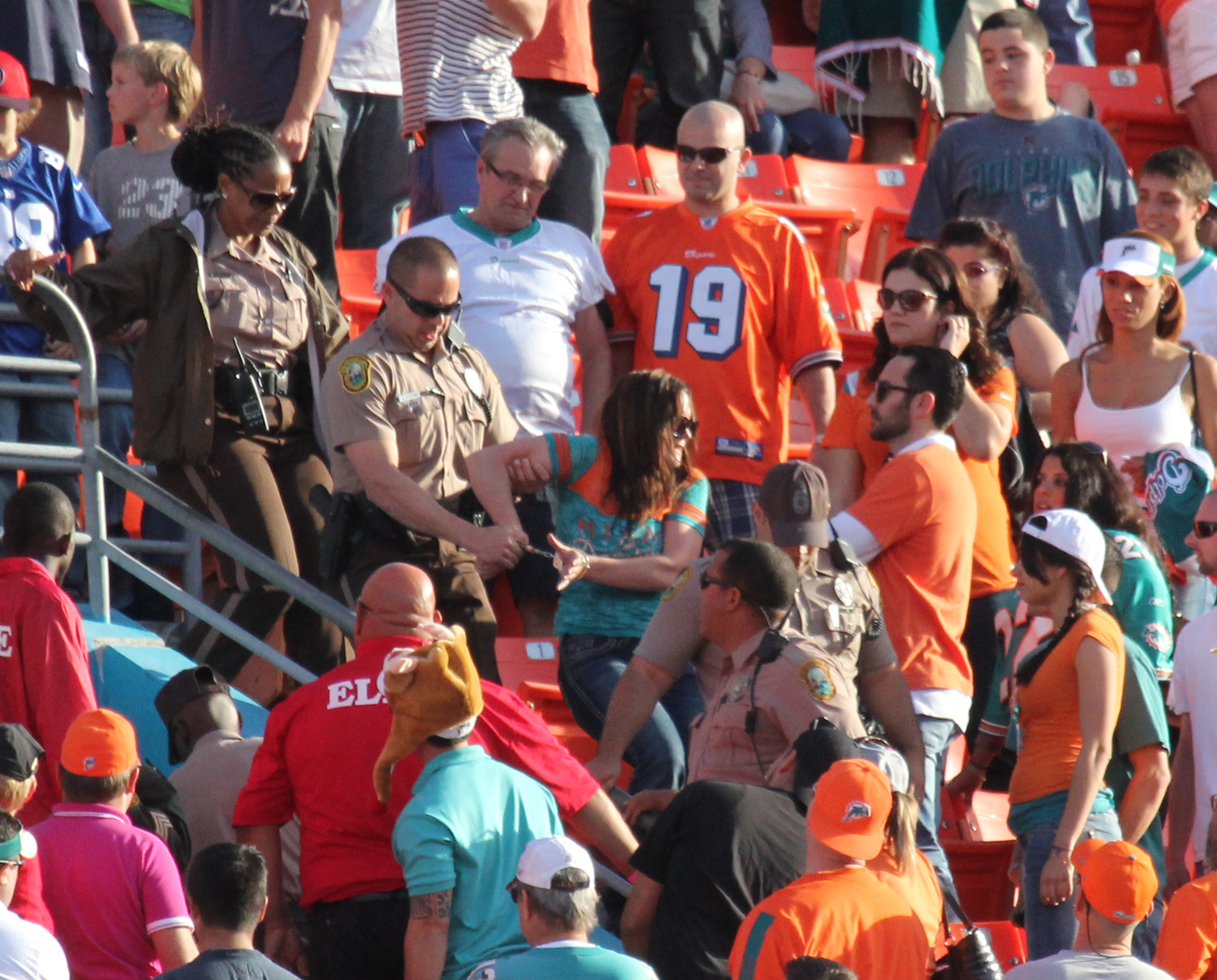
Miami-Dade Police arrest female spectator during NFL match between Miami Dolphins and Buffalo Bills at Sun Life Stadium, December 24, 2012.

Violence may also be related to nationalism or as an outlet for underlying social tensions. It is often alcohol-related.

Violence by supporters of sports teams dates back to Roman times, when supporters of chariot racing teams were frequently involved in major riots, leading Roman authorities to frequently cancel sporting events. Usually, underlying political and/or theological issues helped fuel riots related to sporting events in the Roman era. The Nika riots of 532 were especially deadly, with tens of thousands reportedly killed.

In periods when theatre was considered a form of mass entertainment, there were phenomena of rival fans supporting rival actors or theatrical teams, occasionally leading to violent outbursts having many similarities to present-day violence of sports fans – the Astor Place Riot in 1849 New York City being a conspicuous example.

The actions of English football hooligans and firms in the 1980s caused English teams to be banned from European competition for six years after the Heysel Stadium disaster in 1985. Although the level of football-related violence was significantly reduced in England after this event, in the Euro 2004 tournament, England was publicly warned that any violence by supporters at matches could result in their ejection from the tournament. Many known hooligans were prevented from traveling to the tournament in Portugal. There was a collective sigh of relief from security experts in the USA when England failed to qualify for the 1994 FIFA World Cup. Alan Rothenberg (chairman of the World Cup organizing committee in the United States in 1994) said:

There were three countries in the world whose presence would have created logistical and security problems, so we're very pleased they won't be coming: Iraq, Iran and England.

=== Notable examples of fan violence ===
- In AD 59, a gladiator show in Pompeii led to a riot involving residents of Pompeii and neighboring Nuceria, leading to numerous deaths. After an investigation by the Roman Senate, the town of Pompeii was banned from holding gladiator shows for 10 years.
- In 532, the rivalry between supporters of the Blue and Green chariot-racing teams in Constantinople led to 30,000 deaths in the Nika riots.
- The first meeting in the American football rivalry between Brigham Young University and the University of Utah took place in April 1896, when BYU was known as Brigham Young Academy. The two schools disagree to this day as to whether this game was official, but it mattered greatly to the spectators—at the end of the game, the two sets of fans fought one another.
- In the second edition of the Tour de France in 1904, as the riders climbed the Col de la République in the Loire department, supporters of regional favorite Antoine Fauré physically attacked several of his opponents. The repercussions of this incident continue to this day—the Tour did not return to Loire until 1950, and although the Tour has returned to the République (the first pass of 1,000 metres ever climbed in the Tour) 11 times since then, its appearances in the 1903 and 1904 Tours are no longer officially recognized as Tour climbs.
- In 1972, Oregon pummeled Oregon State 30–3 in their annual "Civil War" football rivalry game, held this season at Oregon State's Parker Stadium. After the game, jubilant Oregon fans rushed the field and tore down the south goal post. They then turned to do the same to the north goal post, but were met by Oregon State fans who had come on the field, resulting in a major brawl.
- In 1975, cyclist Eddy Merckx was viciously punched by a spectator as he climbed the Puy-de-Dôme in the Tour de France. Merckx, who had won the Tour de France five times previously and at the time was in the leader's yellow jersey, finished the stage barely able to breathe, and went on to finish the tour in second place overall.
- The 1980 Scottish Cup Final between bitter Old Firm rivals Celtic and Rangers was marred by an on-pitch riot between rival fans. The result was the banning of alcohol from Scottish football and rugby matches.
- After Marvin Hagler knocked out Alan Minter in three rounds to win boxing's world middleweight title at Wembley Arena in 1980, many of Minter's supporters began to throw beer cans, bottles and other objects into the ring. Both Hagler and Minter, along with their respective handlers, had to be escorted out by Scotland Yard.
- On August 12, 1984, during a game between the Atlanta Braves and San Diego Padres that degenerated into a beanball war:
  - At least five fans were dragged from the field at Atlanta–Fulton County Stadium in handcuffs after participating in a bench-clearing brawl.
  - One of the fans was charged with assault for throwing a full beer mug at the Padres' Kurt Bevacqua, hitting him in the head, as he was returning to the dugout.
  - The game ended with police riot squads on top of both dugouts in an obvious attempt to keep fans away from the players.
- At the end of the same season, violence erupted outside of Tiger Stadium in Detroit after the Detroit Tigers defeated the Padres in the World Series. A well known photo from the riot shows a Tigers fan holding a World Series pennant in front of an overturned burning Detroit Police car.
- Heysel Stadium disaster – 39 people died when a wall collapsed under pressure of Juventus supporters fleeing from 'football hooligans' supporting Liverpool during the 1985 European Cup Final.
- Dinamo–Red Star riot – a 1990 football match between Red Star Belgrade and Dinamo Zagreb was abandoned after ten minutes with thousands of fans fighting each other and the police. One of the Zagreb players, Zvonimir Boban, was seen to kick a policeman, and after an hour long riot, the stadium was set on fire. Dinamo fans saw the riot as the beginning of the Croatian War of Independence.
- In 1993, a mentally ill tennis fan stabbed Monica Seles during a changeover at a tennis match in Germany.
- In 1994, Vancouver Canucks fans rioted in the streets of Vancouver after their team lost in the Stanley Cup Final.
- During the 1994 FIFA World Cup, Colombian football (soccer) player Andrés Escobar accidentally scored an own goal in a match against the United States, a match which Colombia lost 2–1. On his return to Colombia, Escobar was confronted outside a bar in Medellín by a gunman who shot the player six times, killing him. The gunman reportedly shouted "¡Gol!" ("Goal!") for each bullet fired.
- Rioting Indian fans at the Eden Gardens stadium in Calcutta forced the end of the semi-final match between India and Sri Lanka during the 1996 Cricket World Cup. Fans started rioting when the home team, seemingly on the way to victory, underwent a dramatic batting collapse. Match referee Clive Lloyd brought the teams off the ground for their safety, then attempted to restart the match. When the fans remained throwing projectiles and damaging stadium facilities, the match was called off and awarded to Sri Lanka (who went on to win the World Cup).
- In 1996 during a night Australian Football League match at Waverley Park in Melbourne between Essendon and St Kilda, a pitch invasion occurred when the lights went out during the third quarter. Initially, a serious car crash into power lines in the nearby area was reported to have caused the blackout, although it was later confirmed to be a major electrical fault. In the midst of the chaos, fans rioted and stormed the ground, some lighting bonfires in the centre square, and removing two of the behind posts. The incidents were filmed on Network Seven, and the remaining quarter and a half was played three nights later.
- In 1998, Denver Broncos fans rioted in the streets of Denver after their team won Super Bowl XXXII. Near-riots happened when the team won the Super Bowl again the following year and after the Colorado Avalanche's Stanley Cup wins in 1996 and 2001.
- A similar incident occurred in Oakland, California in 2003 when fans rioted and destroyed property after the Oakland Raiders lost to the Tampa Bay Buccaneers in Super Bowl XXXVII.
- In July 2000, 13 people were trampled to death in a riot at a 2002 FIFA World Cup qualifying match in Harare, Zimbabwe after South Africa took a 2–0 lead over Zimbabwe.
- In June 2000, Los Angeles Lakers fans stormed the streets of Los Angeles after the Lakers' victory over the Indiana Pacers in the 2000 NBA Finals. Fans briefly celebrated by starting bonfires, but it soon turned into a riot, with fans dancing and stomping on parked cars, and even turning a news van over.
- In May 2001 during an Australian Football League match between Geelong and Carlton at Optus Oval, Geelong's Darren Milburn executed a very late and illegal bump on Carlton's Steven Silvagni, collecting Silvagni's head with his hip, knocking Silvagni unconscious and leaving him having to be carried from the field by trainers. Milburn then proceeded to clap towards the crowd after being substituted, further igniting the situation; Carlton fans threatened Milburn, attempted to enter the interchange box to assault him, and attempted to attack Milburn's police escort in the car park after the match. Milburn was suspended for three matches for the incident.
- In May 2004 after an Australian Football League Friday Night Football match between Adelaide and St Kilda at AAMI Stadium which St Kilda won by 32 points, field umpires were booed and abused by Adelaide fans, and a drink bottle was thrown which hit a 12-year-old St Kilda fan. One fan was ejected and banned for one year from the arena.
- In September 2004 in the Cairns Australian Football League Grand Final between the North Cairns Tigers and the Port Douglas Crocs at Cazaly's Stadium, a wild and violent 15 minute bench-clearing brawl erupted after Tigers players charged at the Crocs pre-match huddle at the end of the national anthem, and escalated when fans and team officials became involved. One fan was arrested and another five were ejected, while three Crocs players and a Crocs runner were left unconscious and having to be carried from the arena on stretchers. After a lengthy AFL investigation, the instigator, North Cairns Tigers coach and former VFL/AFL player Jason Love, was suspended for eight years, and the 22 North Cairns players were suspended for a total of 400 matches (suspensions ranging from 10 matches to five years) on a string of charges in relation to starting the brawl; the Tigers were forced to forfeit their first match of 2005 as a result of these suspensions. AFL Cairns declared the Grand Final a "no result" and withheld the 2004 premiership.
- In October 2004, after the Boston Red Sox defeated the New York Yankees at Yankee Stadium in Game 7 of the American League Championship Series, Red Sox fans rioted near Fenway Park in Boston. Police used "pepper guns" in some cases, and an Emerson College student, Victoria Snelgrove, was killed by a paintball-like projectile that hit her in the eye.
- On November 19, 2004, near the end of an NBA game between the Indiana Pacers and Detroit Pistons, a brawl erupted between Pacers players and Pistons supporters.
- On April 12, 2005, the UEFA Champions League quarterfinal between intracity rivals A.C. Milan and Inter Milan was abandoned after Inter fans threw missiles and flares on to the pitch at the San Siro stadium, with A.C. Milan goalkeeper Dida hit by a flare.
- In May 2006 during an Australian Football League match between North Melbourne and St Kilda, a North Melbourne fan had a provocative confrontation with coach Dean Laidley, to which Laidley responded with a verbal barrage, inviting the fan to the club rooms to see how badly the players were feeling due to their consistently poor on-field performance. The incident was captured on Australian national television. The fan committed suicide by throwing himself in the path of an oncoming train the next morning.
- On June 6, 2010, the final game of the Greek Basket League finals between ancient rivals Olympiacos and Panathinaikos (PAO), also respectively known as the "Reds" and "Greens" from their club colors, degenerated into what one commentator called a "night of shame" for Greek basketball. Panathinaikos entered the game, held at Olympiacos' home of Peace and Friendship Stadium, with a 2–1 lead in the best-of-5 series. The homestanding Reds fans were reportedly incensed at what they considered to be biased officiating in the Greens' favor in Game 3. The violence began even before tipoff, with police forced to use tear gas on rioting Reds fans; the game started 40 minutes late. In the third quarter, with PAO leading 50–42, the game was halted for about an hour after Olympiacos fans threw various incendiaries at the PAO bench, with one smoke bomb exploding next to the bench. By the time the teams resumed play, all but about 2,000 fans had left. Then, with little over a minute left in the game and PAO ahead 76–69, many of the remaining Reds fans began throwing objects on the court, leading the officials to suspend play and forfeit the game to PAO, giving the Greens the title. The new champions had to be escorted off the floor by riot police. The league organizer, HEBA, fined Olympiacos €111,000 and required them to play their first nine home games of the 2010–11 season behind closed doors and without live TV coverage.
- The next meeting between the two teams, this time hosted by Panathinaikos on January 12, 2011, saw Olympiacos win 65–61, followed by a rain of incendiaries from Greens fans at the Reds.

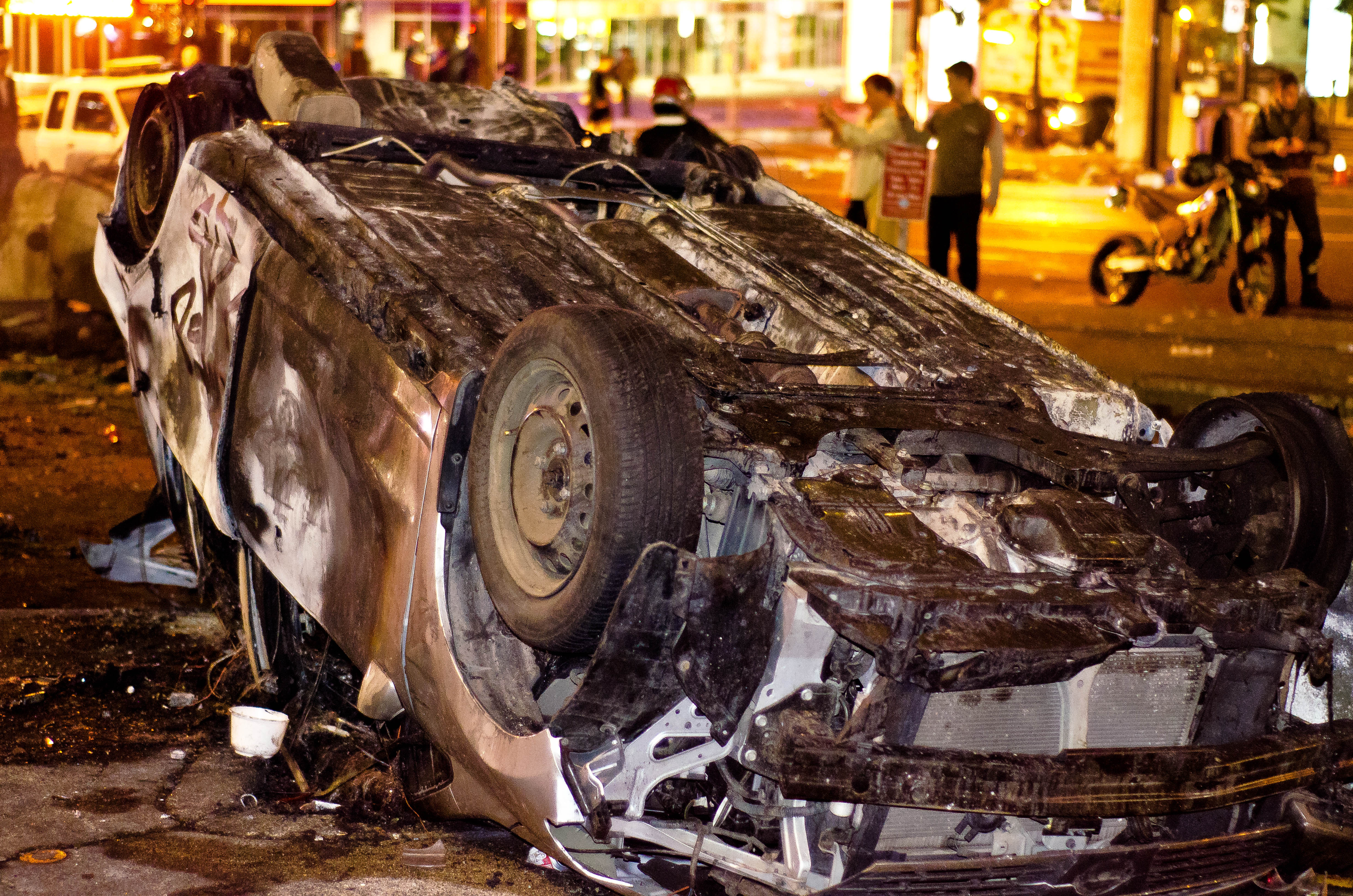
Damaged vehicle in the aftermath of the 2011 Vancouver Stanley Cup riot

- The 2011 Vancouver Stanley Cup riot immediately followed the loss of the Vancouver Canucks hockey team to the Boston Bruins in the deciding game seven of the Stanley Cup Final in June of that year.
- Later in the same month, major violence broke out involving supporters of historic Argentine football club River Plate during and after their promotion/relegation playoff with Belgrano. The first leg on June 22 in Córdoba was delayed for 20 minutes after River Plate hooligans tore through a fence and stormed the field to verbally and physically attack River players. The second leg, on June 26 at El Monumental in Buenos Aires, had what was reported to be the largest security presence for any match in the country's history, with over 2,200 police called in. However, it was not enough to keep River hooligans, angered at what became the club's first relegation from the top flight in their history, from rushing the field. Violence quickly spread, with fires set in the stadium, pitched battles between hooligans and police, and looting in nearby areas. At least 35 police and 55 civilians were reported to have been injured.
- On December 21, 2011, a fourth round match in the 2011–12 KNVB Cup between Eredivisie clubs Ajax and AZ at Ajax's home of Amsterdam Arena was marred by a violent fan incident. In the 36th minute, Ajax held a 1–0 lead when a fan ran on the pitch and launched a karate kick from behind at AZ goalkeeper Esteban Alvarado. The player responded by kicking the fan several times before security arrived. When Alvarado was sent off for retaliating against his attacker, AZ left the pitch, and the match was abandoned. The KNVB rescinded the red card and ordered the match replayed in its entirety behind closed doors on January 19, 2012. Ajax was also fined €10,000 for failing to prevent the fan—who was supposed to be serving a 3-year stadium ban—from entering the pitch, and given a suspended one-match spectator ban (not including the replay). Ajax accepted the penalties, and announced that it had given the fan a 30-year stadium ban and a lifetime ban from the club and its season ticket list.
- In 2021, fans of the NHL's Montreal Canadiens rioted on the streets of Downtown Montreal after the Canadiens defeated the Vegas Golden Knights in game six of their best-of-seven series by a score of 3–2 in overtime to advance to their first Stanley Cup Final since the 1992-1993 season. Fans set off fireworks, flipped and vandalized police cars, assaulted police officers, threw projectiles, and broke other municipal bylaws in the process, which forced the Bell Centre into a lockdown, locking down the 3,500 fans who saw the game live until police gave the all-clear. The situation was also notable for the fact that it happened on Saint-Jean-Baptiste Day (June 24), Quebec's national holiday, in addition to happening less than one month following the end of the first province-wide curfew in Quebec imposed by Premier François Legault in response to the COVID-19 pandemic in Quebec, which lasted from the beginning of January to the end of May of that year. The Canadiens would eventually fall to the Tampa Bay Lightning in the 2021 Stanley Cup Final in five games, and would finish in last place in the NHL the following season.
- In 2024, following the AFC Divisional Round NFL playoff game between the Buffalo Bills and Kansas City Chiefs at Highmark Stadium in Orchard Park, New York where the Chiefs defeated the Bills 27–24, Chiefs quarterback Patrick Mahomes was pelted with snowballs from the fans as was star tight end Travis Kelce and star linebacker Drue Tranquill. Coming into the game, Buffalo had two previous postseason encounters with Mahomes and Kansas City, both of them resulting in losses, in 2021 and in 2022, albeit at Arrowhead Stadium in Kansas City. The Buffalo region also had to deal with heavy snowfalls in the days leading up to the game, a situation that also occurred prior to the Bills’ previous playoff game against the Pittsburgh Steelers the preceding week. In both situations, the team had to hire fans to shovel snow out of the stadium’s walkways and paid them $20 per hour for doing so. Following the game, Tranquill took to social media, calling out the fan who threw a snowball at him, claiming that he caught the snowball and was ready to retaliate had it not broken in his hand upon catching it.

== Athlete violence ==
=== American football ===
- In a National Football League game on November 1, 1970, the Kansas City Chiefs led the Oakland Raiders 17–14, and a long run for a first-down run by quarterback Len Dawson apparently sealed victory for the Chiefs in the final minute when Dawson was speared by Raiders defensive end Ben Davidson, who dove into Dawson with his helmet as he lay on the ground, provoking Chiefs’ receiver Otis Taylor to attack Davidson. After a bench-clearing brawl, Taylor and Davidson were ejected, and the penalties that were called nullified the first down under the rules in effect at that time. The Chiefs were obliged to punt, and the Raiders tied the game on a George Blanda field goal with eight seconds to play. Taylor's unwise retaliation against Davidson's foul play not only cost the Chiefs a win, but Oakland won the AFC West with a season record of 8–4–2, while Kansas City finished 7–5–2 and out of the playoffs. See also Chiefs–Raiders rivalry.

=== Association football ===
- 17 March 1971: Boca Juniors and Sporting Cristal met at the 1971 Copa Libertadores. At the final minutes of match, Boca Juniors Roberto Rogel fell to the floor in the penalty area, but the Uruguayan referee Alejandro Otero dismissed their penalty appeal. Boca Junior's player Rubén Suñé retaliated by violently shin-kicking Sporting Cristal's Alfredo Quesada during the next passage of play. The contact between both players soon escalated and involved both teams violently fighting each other. 19 red cards were issued, 10 Peruvian and 9 Argentine players were arrested after the incident.
- April 2, 2005: Newcastle United teammates Lee Bowyer and Kieron Dyer were sent off after fighting one another near the end of the team's 3–0 loss to Aston Villa. Several Newcastle players and a Villa player separated the two before either was seriously hurt, but Bowyer's shirt was ripped.
- March 12, 2020: the first Grenal derby match between Grêmio and Internacional at a Copa Libertadores (nicknamed "O Grenal das Américas") resulted in a major brawl with 9 red cards issued.
- 5 January 2026: Muhammad Hilmi Gimnastiar, who played for Indonesian Liga 4 side PS Putra Jaya Pasuruan, received a lifetime ban from the East Java Football Association and was fined 2.5 million Indonesian Rupiah after he delivered a kung-fu style kick into the torso of opposing team Perseta 1970 Tulungagung's Firman Nugraha during a round of 32 match, who was hospitalised with broken ribs, shortness of breath and seizures.
- 19 July 2026: After the final whistle after Spain's 1–0 victory over Argentina in the 2026 FIFA World Cup Final, Argentine defender Nahuel Molina punched Spain's captain Rodri in the abdomen. Midfielder Leandro Paredes also became involved by grabbing Eric García by the throat and throwing Gavi to the ground, initiating an altercation involving substitutes and coaching staff before the players were separated.

=== Australian rules football ===
- In 1994, Swans recruit Dermott Brereton was suspended for 7 weeks for standing on Hawthorn player Rayden Tallis' head during a practice match; he was suspended for another 7 matches later in the season for elbowing Richmond captain Tony Free and breaking his jaw. When Brereton transferred to Collingwood at the end of 1994 the AFL decided that his 7-week suspension was no longer applicable as it was applied to the club (Sydney) and not to the player (Brereton). St Kilda forward Tony Lockett was suspended for 8 matches during the season for elbowing Sydney's Peter Caven and breaking his nose.
- Perhaps the most violent match in AFL history took place on June 5, 2004 Round 11, at the MCG between Hawthorn and Essendon. The final score was Hawthorn 12.8 (80) to Essendon 24.10 (154). During halftime, Brereton, by now Hawthorn club director, allegedly told Hawks players to draw a "line in the sand" and take a physical stand against the Bombers. In the third quarter, a number of on-field incidents led to several fights around the ground, culminating in a five-minute bench-clearing brawl. The incidents led to record penalties from the AFL Tribunal, with five players suspended for a combined total of 16 matches and players involved in the melee fined a combined total of A$70,700, the most from a single match in VFL/AFL history. The fracas was described by Tribunal Chairman Brian Collis, QC, as bringing "football into disrepute". This match would enter AFL lore as the Line in the Sand Match.

=== Badminton ===
- Thai badminton players Bodin Isara and Maneepong Jongjit had a fist fight after the 2013 Canada Open Grand Prix men's double final match. Both players received a sanction from the Badminton World Federation and from the Badminton Association of Thailand in aftermath of the brawl.

=== Baseball ===
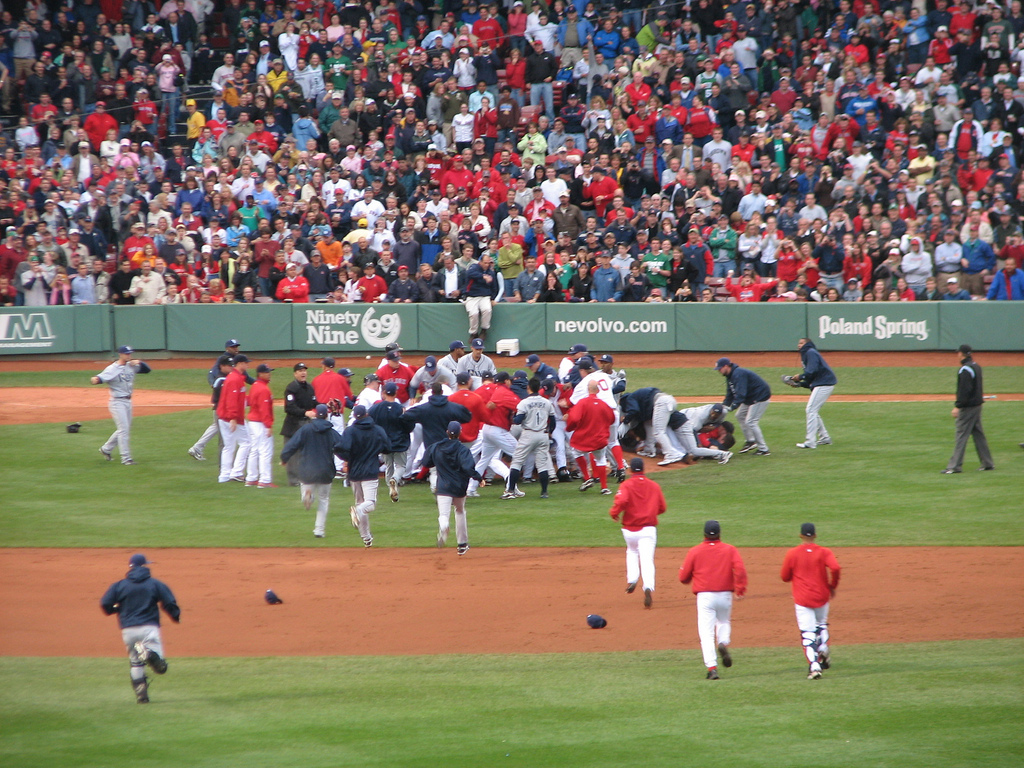
Bench-clearing brawl at Fenway Park because of Coco Crisp getting hit by a pitch by James Shields.

- The first contest in what would become one of the most intense rivalries in U.S. college sports, an 1895 baseball game between Brigham Young Academy, now Brigham Young University, and the University of Utah, ended in a scoreless tie, immediately followed by a bench-clearing brawl.
- This was far from the last violent incident in the baseball version of the BYU–Utah rivalry:
  - In one 1966 game, a Utah batter intentionally hit BYU's catcher with his bat.
  - In another game in the mid-1980s, a number of BYU players were heckling Utah's pitcher. The pitcher went into his stretch, and then turned and fired a fastball into the BYU dugout, leading to a bench-clearing brawl.
  - Yet another game in the same era saw a Utah player get a base hit with two outs and two on in the bottom of the ninth inning in a tied game. The lead runner could have scored the winning run uncontested—but he instead went out of his way to run over BYU's catcher, who was standing on the first-base side of home plate (the opposite side from a runner heading for home). The runner was called out and ejected, and BYU went on to win in extra innings.
- On August 22, 1965 in Candlestick Park in San Francisco, California, in what is considered to be one of the most violent on-field brawls in sports history, pitcher Juan Marichal of the San Francisco Giants hit catcher John Roseboro of the Los Angeles Dodgers on the head with a bat, opening a gash on Roseboro's head starting a 14-minute brawl between the teams in the middle of a heated pennant race. Marichal was subsequently suspended for eight games and fined him a then-NL record $1,750 (equivalent to $18,000 in 2025).
- On August 12, 1984, a game between the Atlanta Braves and San Diego Padres turned into what writers Bruce Nash and Allan Zullo later called "one of the worst beanball wars of modern times", starting with Braves pitcher Pascual Pérez hitting Alan Wiggins with the game's first pitch, followed by four attempts by Padres pitchers to hit Pérez in retaliation, and ending in Braves reliever Donnie Moore hitting Graig Nettles. The chaos led to four bench-clearing incidents, one of which lasted at least 10 minutes; ejections of both managers and 12 players and coaches; multiple suspensions of individuals involved in the fracas; and fan involvement (see above).

=== Basketball ===
- In a 1972 college basketball game, Ohio State University were leading the University of Minnesota 50–44 with 36 seconds left to play in the game. Ohio State's Luke Witte was fouled hard going to the basket by Minnesota's Corky Taylor, who punched the dazed Witte in the face and kneed him in the groin. Gopher reserve Ron Behagen then stomped on Witte's neck and head. Witte was not the only victim of violence, as a larger brawl broke out, with two other Gophers, Jim Brewer and future Baseball Hall of Famer Dave Winfield, attacking other Ohio State players. Witte was taken off the court on a stretcher and booed by Minnesota fans. He was the most seriously injured among three Buckeyes players taken to hospitals.
- In an NBA game on December 9, 1977, Kermit Washington of the Los Angeles Lakers was already fighting with Kevin Kunnert of the Houston Rockets when Rudy Tomjanovich of the Rockets came running toward them. Seeing a man in an opponent uniform rushing at him, Washington instinctively turned and punched Tomjanovich in the face, resulting in a near-fatal season-ending injury to Tomjanovich. The NBA suspended Washington for 60 days (26 games) and fined him $10,000. A civil jury awarded Tomjanovich $3.2 million. This incident is the subject of the book The Punch by John Feinstein.
- On November 19, 2004, the infamous Malice at the Palace between the Detroit Pistons and the Indiana Pacers players, as well as spectators, took place in Auburn Hills, Michigan. It ranks among the worst episodes of sports violence in American sports history.
- On August 19, 2010, the final game of the Acropolis International Tournament between Greece and Serbia at the Olympic Indoor Hall in Athens ended in a bench-clearing brawl with 2:40 left and Greece leading 74–73. The melee started when Greece's Antonis Fotsis moved threateningly toward Serbia's Miloš Teodosić after a hard foul. Teodosic responded by punching Fotsis in the face while Nenad Krstić also tried to grab the Greek player. Greece's 360 lb center Sofoklis Schortsanitis joined the fight attacking multiple Serbian players and spreading havoc. Krstic punched Schortsanitis several times in his back. When he started pursuing the retreating Krstić, the Serbian player responded by throwing a chair at him. The chair missed Schortsanitis but hit his teammate Ioannis Bourousis in the head, drawing blood. Players from both teams fought in the tunnel leading from the arena before being separated, and a few fans joined the fight but were quickly taken from the arena. Krstić was arrested by Greek police, but was released the following day. FIBA responded by suspending two players from each team for part of the subsequent FIBA World Championship. For Serbia, Krstić was suspended for the tournament's first three games and Teodosić for two games; Greece's Fotsis and Schortsanitis were also suspended for two games each.
- Later that year, on October 12, an exhibition match between the China and Brazil national teams in Xuchang was marred by rough play from both sides before escalating into open exchanges of kicks and punches, followed by a bench-clearing brawl. After the teams were separated, China players attacked the Brazilians as they were heading to the locker room. Brazil refused to return to the court or to play the fourth and final match in their scheduled series. The Chinese national federation issued an official apology to Brazil the following day. This was the latest in a series of incidents involving the China team that had already resulted in tens of thousands of US$ in fines from both FIBA and FIBA Asia. Ultimately, China head coach Bob Donewald Jr. was suspended for China's next three FIBA matches; three China players drew suspensions of one or two games; and the three match officials were suspended from FIBA matches for one year.
- On August 18, 2011, another Chinese team, the Bayi Rockets of the Chinese Basketball Association, was involved in a major scuffle with the touring Georgetown University men's team. After three quarters of highly physical play from both sides, the game turned ugly with the teams tied at 64 with 9:32 remaining in the final quarter. At that point, both benches emptied and the teams began fighting one another. One Georgetown player had a chair thrown at him by an unidentified individual, with reports differing on whether he was hit. Another Georgetown player who had been struck during the brawl picked up a chair in apparent self-defense. As the brawl progressed, some fans joined in the action, with one wielding a stanchion. Hoyas coach John Thompson III pulled his team from the court; the team had to dodge water bottles and other objects thrown by fans, and one Georgetown fan was reportedly knocked to the ground by a thrown bottle.
- On July 2, 2018, a bench-clearing brawl broke out between the Australia and Philippines men's national teams during a World Cup qualifier in Bocaue. With Australia leading by over 30 points with just over 4:00 left in the third quarter, play was halted for a foul. Australia's Daniel Kickert then swung his elbow at an unsuspecting Philippines player, immediately leading to both benches clearing and a melee spreading from the bench to one of the baskets. When order was restored and game officials reviewed video of the incident, a total of 13 players were ejected—four from Australia (including Kickert) and nine from the Philippines. This left the hosts with only three players to resume the game; after two of the remaining Philippines players fouled out, leaving that team with only one player, the officials called the game, with Australia winning 89–53.

=== Ice hockey ===
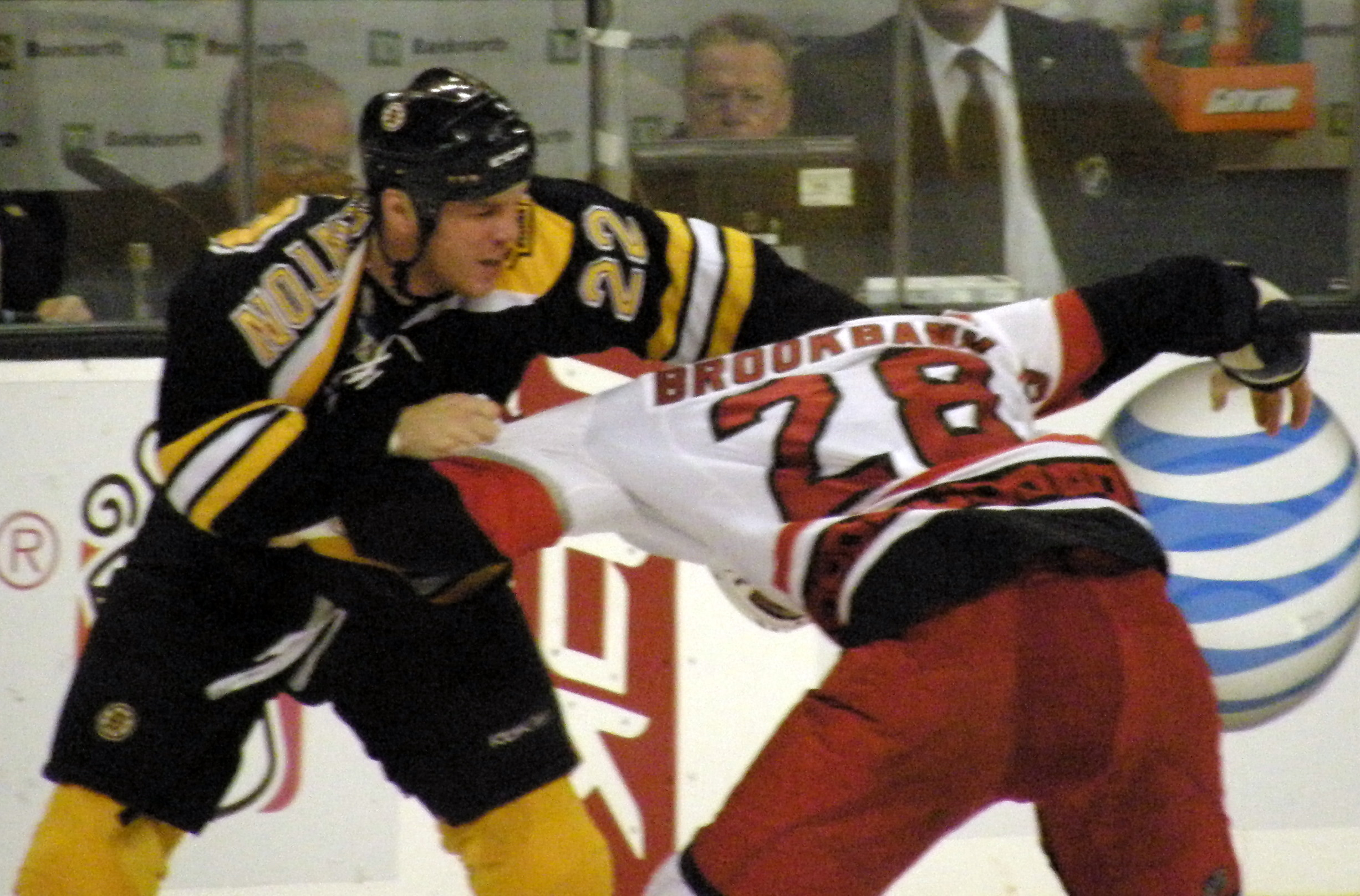
A fight between Shawn Thornton and Wade Brookbank. Fighting in ice hockey is an established tradition with a long history.

Violence has been a part of ice hockey since at least the early 1900s. According to the book Hockey: A People's History, in 1904 alone, four players were killed during hockey games from the frequent brawls and violent stickwork. Fighting in ice hockey is an established tradition of the sport in North America, with a long history involving many levels of amateur and professional play and including some notable individual fights. While officials tolerate fighting during hockey games, they impose a variety of penalties on players who engage in fights. Unique to North American professional team sports, the National Hockey League (NHL) and most minor professional leagues in North America do not eject players outright for fighting but major European and collegiate hockey leagues do.

The debate over allowing fighting in ice hockey games is ongoing. Despite its potentially negative consequences, such as heavier enforcers (or "heavyweights") knocking each other out, some administrators are not considering eliminating fighting from the game, as some players consider it essential. Additionally, the majority of fans oppose eliminating fights from professional hockey games.

- In an NHL preseason game between the Boston Bruins and St. Louis Blues on September 21, 1969, Bruins defenseman Ted Green and Blues left wing Wayne Maki, attacking Green, engaged in a bloody stick-swinging fight that resulted in Green sustaining a skull fracture and brain damage, forcing him to miss the entirety of the 1969–70 NHL season, with Maki emerging uninjured. As a result of the fight, Green played for the remaining nine years of his professional career with a pioneering variety of hockey helmet in both the NHL and WHA.
- April 20, 1984 – A bench-clearing brawl broke out at the end of the second period of a second-round playoffs matchup between the Quebec Nordiques and the Montreal Canadiens, after many smaller-scale battles had occurred throughout the game. A second bench-clearing brawl erupted before the third period began, provoked by the announcement of penalties; a total of 252 penalty minutes were incurred and 10 players were ejected. This game prompted referee Bruce Hood to retire from the NHL once the playoffs ended, and is commonly referred to as the Good Friday Massacre.
- On January 4, 1987, the final game of the World Junior Ice Hockey Championships, involving Canada and the Soviet Union, saw intense physical (and often dirty) play by both sides, culminating in a bench-clearing brawl that lasted over 20 minutes. Event organizers, in a futile attempt to stop the fighting, turned the arena lights off. Eventually, the game was declared null and void, and both teams were ejected from the competition, costing the Canadians a medal. Virtually all of the players on the Canadian team were suspended for 18 months, while the Soviet Union players were permanently banned from international competition, and the coaching staffs of both teams were fired. The match referee, widely blamed for losing control of the game, never worked another international match. A book by Gare Joyce was written regarding the event.
- February 9, 2001 – A game between the Nottingham Panthers and the Sheffield Steelers in the British Superleague saw "one of the worst scenes of violence seen at a British ice hockey rink". When Sheffield enforcer Dennis Vial crosschecked Nottingham forward Greg Hadden, Panthers enforcer Barry Nieckar subsequently fought with Vial which eventually escalated into a 36-man bench-clearing brawl. Referee Moray Hanson sent both teams to their locker rooms and delayed the game for 45 minutes while tempers cooled and the officials sorted out the penalties. Eight players and both coaches were ejected, and a British record total of 404 penalty minutes were incurred during the second period. The league handed out 30 games in suspensions to four players and Steelers coach Mike Blaisdell and a total of £8,400 in fines.
- March 5, 2004 – A Philadelphia Flyers – Ottawa Senators game resulted in five consecutive brawls in the closing minutes of the game, including fights between many players who are not known as enforcers and a fight between Flyers goalie Robert Esche and Senators goalie Patrick Lalime. The game ended with an NHL record 419 penalty minutes, and an NHL record 20 players were ejected, leaving five players on the team benches. The officials took 90 minutes to sort out the penalties that each team had received.
- January 9, 2010 – In a Kontinental Hockey League game between Vityaz Chekhov and Avangard Omsk, a bench-clearing brawl broke out in the 4th minute of the first period, and a bench- and penalty-box-clearing brawl broke out 39 seconds later, forcing officials to abandon the game as there were only four players left. Thirty-three players and both teams' coaches were ejected, and a world-record total of 707 penalty minutes were incurred during the game. The KHL imposed fines totaling 5.7 million rubles ($191,000), suspended seven players, and counted the game as a 5–0 defeat for both teams, with no points being awarded.

=== Rugby ===
- During their 1974 tour to South Africa the Lions had a 99 call that was a policy of simultaneous retaliation, and on the same tour the "Battle of Boet Erasmus Stadium" was one of the most violent matches in rugby history,
- In 2010, South African lock Bakkies Botha head-butted New Zealand halfback Jimmy Cowan during a Tri-Nations tournament match and was subsequently suspended for 9 weeks.

=== Other sports ===
- On 6 December 1956, at the 1956 Melbourne Olympics and shortly after the Hungarian Revolution, players at the semi-final water polo match between Hungary and the USSR would use any form of violence they could manage whenever the players of opposing teams came in contact. In the closing minutes of the match, Soviet player Valentin Prokopov punched Hungarian player Ervin Zádor, and it was coined as the Blood in the Water match after Zádor emerged with blood pouring from above his eye. Tensions were at an all-time high between the competing teams; the Soviet armed forces had violently suppressed the Hungarian Revolution just weeks before. Most of the Revolutionaries consisted of civilians, a majority factory workers and students, who constructed Molotov cocktails against the formal armed forces of the USSR. Throughout the match, players would use any form of violence they could manage whenever the players of opposing teams came in contact. Zador’s injury occurred in the closing minutes of the match. Chaos ensued with the crowd booing the Russians.
- On 24 August 2008, during the Olympics, Ángel Matos of Cuba angrily kicked a referee after being told he was disqualified in the bronze medal match. World Taekwondo later banned Matos for life, along with his coach.
- On 4 October 2020, during the FIA Karting World Championship final, Luca Corberi threw the detached front bumper of his kart at another driver's kart as it drove past after a collision with them on the previous lap, and physically assaulted the driver in the pitlane. Corberi was promptly banned for 15 years from all motorsport activities sanctioned by the FIA.

== See also ==
- Bench-clearing brawl
- Collective effervescence
- Football War
- Football hooliganism
- Hooliganism
- Sports rivalry
- Violence in baseball
- Violence in ice hockey
- List of hooligan firms
- List of violent spectator incidents in sports
