= Santander Bank =

Wholly owned subsidiary of Spanish Santander Group

Santander Bank, N. A.

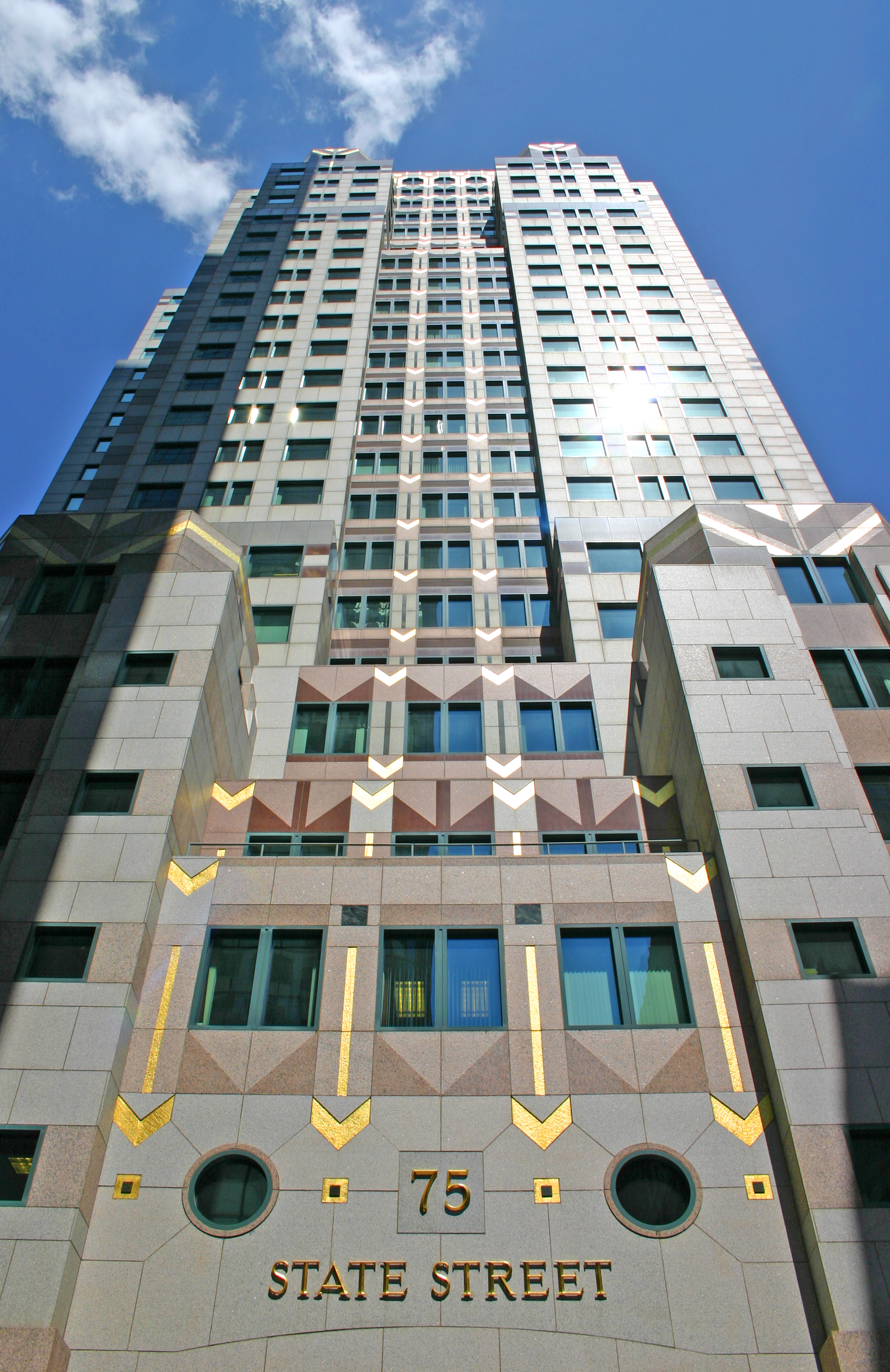
- Headquarters in Boston
- Formerly: Sovereign Bank
- Type: Subsidiary
- Industry: Banking
- Founded: 1902; 124 years ago in Wyomissing, Pennsylvania (as Sovereign Bank)
- Headquarters: 75 State Street, Boston, Massachusetts, United States
- Number of locations: ▼400 (2025)
- Key people: Christiana Reilly (CEO); Tim Ryan (Chair)
- Revenue: ▲US$3.345 billion (2013)
- Operating income: ▼US$1.508 billion (2013)
- Net income: ▼US$1.042 billion (2013)
- Number of employees: ▲10,000 (2020)
- Parent: Santander Group
- Website: santanderbank.com

Santander Bank, N. A. (/ˌsɑːntɑːnˈdɛər/) is an American bank operating as a wholly owned subsidiary of the Spanish Santander Group. It is based in Boston and its principal market is the northeastern United States. It has $57.5 billion in deposits, operates about 650 retail banking offices and over 2,000 ATMs, and employs approximately 9,800 people. It offers an array of financial services and products, including retail banking, mortgages, corporate banking, cash management, credit card, capital markets, trust and wealth management, and insurance.

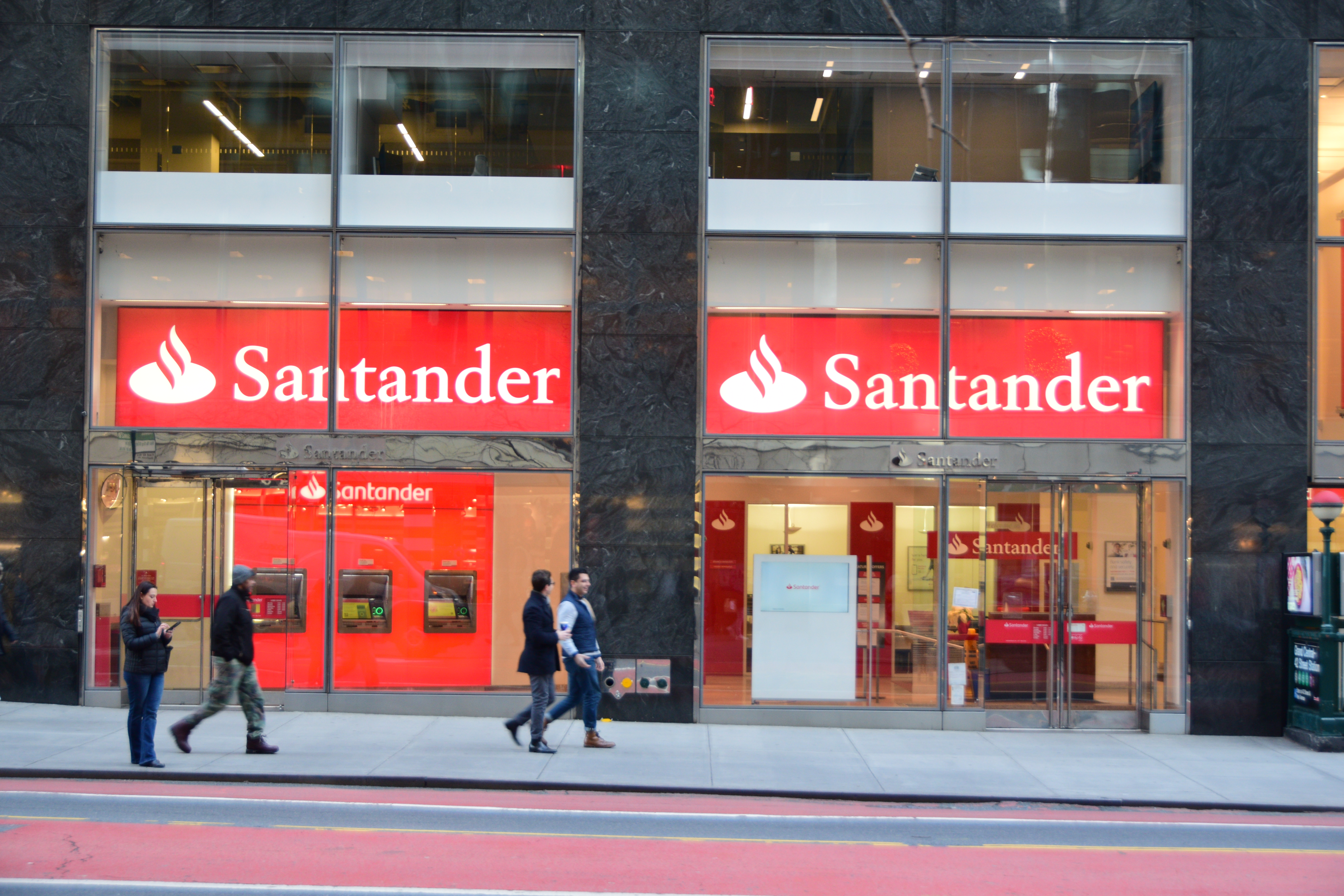
Santander Bank in New York near Grand Central Station

Sovereign Bank changed its name to Santander Bank on October 17, 2013; the stadium, arena, and performing arts center for which it has naming rights were also rebranded.

== History ==
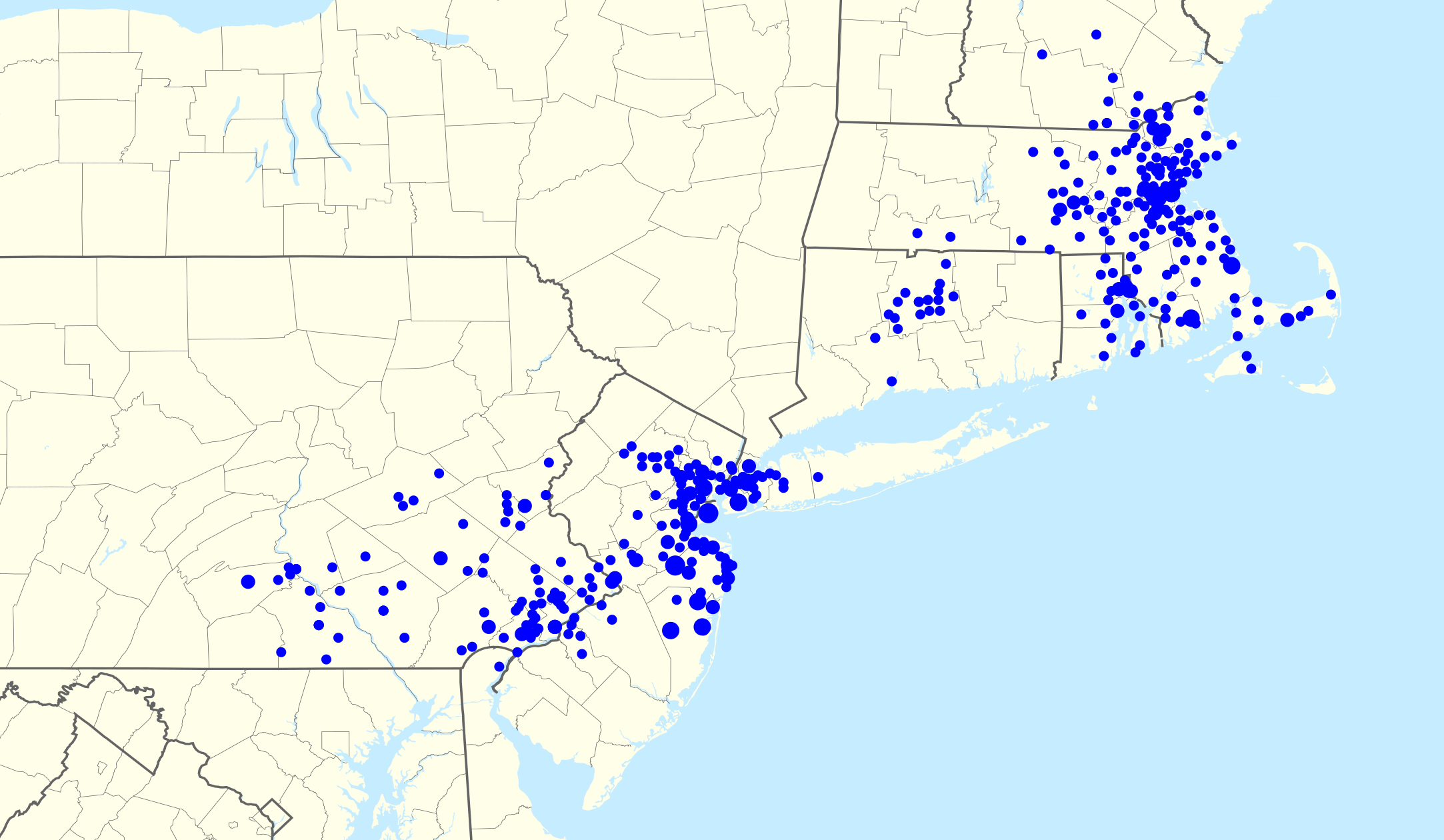
Santander Bank branch footprint in the eastern United States

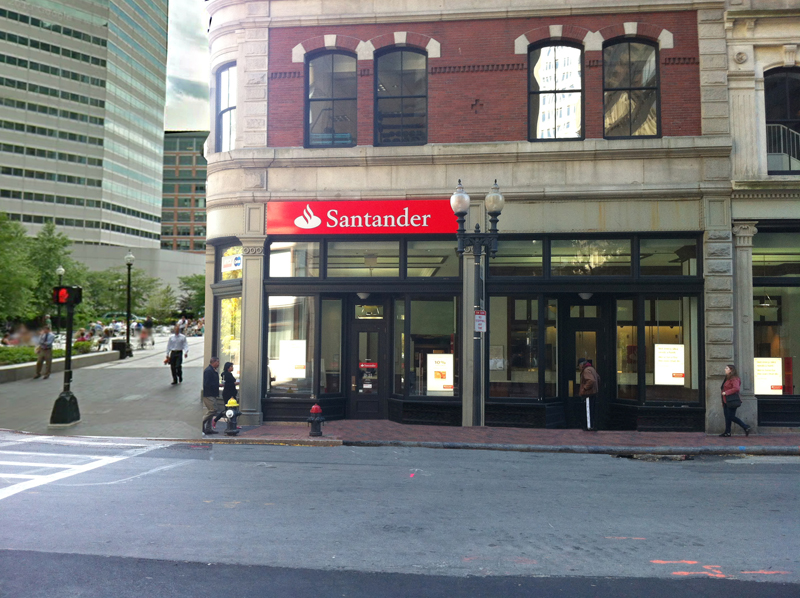
Santander Bank, Summer Street, Boston, United States

Santander Bank, N.A., was founded on October 8, 1902 as Sovereign Bank, a savings and loan in Wyomissing, Pennsylvania. The company's earliest customers were largely textile workers. Sovereign expanded rapidly during the savings and loan crisis of the 1980s and 1990s, acquiring numerous other banks. In 2000, Sovereign bought 278 New England branches from the newly merged FleetBoston Financial, becoming the third-largest retail bank in the Boston area. This transaction was driven by a requirement from bank regulators that Fleet Bank and BankBoston divest 306 branches as a condition for merger.

Forty-five years before the founding of Sovereign Bank, its future parent was founded as Banco Santander on 15 May 1857, with the approval of Queen Isabel II of Spain. The bank grew and in the 1920s started to build a network of branches. In 1942 it opened in Madrid. In 1934 Emilio Botín Sanz de Sautuola y López became director, and in 1950, chairman. He expanded the bank throughout Spain, and in 1957 it was Spain's seventh-largest bank. In 1976 it acquired First National Bank of Puerto Rico, and in 1982 Banco Español-Chile. In 1986, Emilio's oldest son, Emilio Botin-Sanz de Sautuola y García de los Ríos, succeeded him. In the late 1980s he acquired CC-Bank in Germany and a stake was in Banco de Comercio e Industria in Portugal. In 1989, the "Supercuenta Santander" was launched.

Sovereign bought the naming rights to Mercer County's new arena in 1999 in support of newly acquired Trenton Savings Bank (formerly TSFS) and other New Jersey branches for a ten-year term. In following years, the bank also named the Sovereign Center arena and Sovereign Performing Arts Center in Reading, Pennsylvania, and Sovereign Bank Stadium in York, Pennsylvania.

In June 2006, Banco Santander purchased almost 20% of Sovereign Bank for $2.4 billion. As Banco Santander owned 25% of Sovereign, it had the right to buy the bank for $40 per share for one year beginning in the middle of 2008. On 1 June 2006, Sovereign Bank purchased Independence Community Bank Corp. of Brooklyn, New York, for $3.6 billion in cash. Sovereign completed the transition process of Independence and S.I. Bank & Trust customers on 9 September 2006. Sovereign financed this merger through its partial sale to Spain's Banco Santander Central Hispano.

On 13 October 2008, Banco Santander purchased the remainder of Sovereign for $1.9 billion. Sovereign Bank was severely affected by losses related to auto loans and stock in Fannie Mae and Freddie Mac. Banco Santander had previously seen a loss of over $1 billion on its investment in Sovereign, when the latter's share price tumbled after being downgraded by Moody's in September 2008. On 30 January 2009, Banco Santander completed its acquisition of Sovereign Bank, for about $2.51 per share.

In August 2011, the bank announced its plans to formally relocate its U.S. headquarters from Wyomissing, Pennsylvania, to Boston, where its top executives had already been located for several years.

In late September 2011, the bank announced that it would officially change its name to "Santander" as part of its parent company's goal to create a global brand. The rebranding was completed on 17 October 2013.

In March 2015, Scott Powell was appointed head of U.S. business at Santander, and CEO of Santander Holdings USA, replacing Roman Blanco. Powell left his role as CEO in December 2019. He was replaced by Timothy Wennes.

In May 2024, Santander Bank notified its customers of unauthorized access to Snowflake, a third-party database system. Santander's statement stated that hackers successfully accessed data of 30 million customers of Santander Chile, Spain and Uruguay, as well as all current and some former Santander employees.

In February 2025, Christiana Riley was announced to be succeeding Tim Wennes as CEO of Santander US. This action comes as part of a broader restructuration of the bank, which includes eliminating regional divisions and shifting to five global units. Riley, who had joined Santander in 2023, will now be leading the U.S. operations as the bank expands in areas like corporate banking and digital banking. The restructuring will also see changes in other markets, including a new CEO for Banco Santander Chile.

In August 2026, Santander announced the acquisition of Webster Bank.
