= Railer =

Railer or The Railers may refer to:

== Nature ==
- Railer bat, found in Cameroon, Central African Republic, Republic of the Congo

== Music ==
- The Railers (band)
- Railer (album), an album by the American band Lagwagon

== Sport ==
- The Railers (track team)
- Reading Railers basketball
- Worcester Railers hockey team
