= New York Majesty =

Logo

General information
- Founded: 2009
- Folded: 2010
- Stadium: Sovereign Center
- Headquartered: Reading, Pennsylvania
- Colors: White with red trim
- Website: www.lflus.com/nymajesty/

Personnel
- Owners: Lingerie Football League, LLC
- Head coach: Henry Racich

League / conference affiliations
- Lingerie Football League; Eastern Conference

The New York Majesty was a women's American football team based in Reading, Pennsylvania, that played for only the 2009–10 season as a member of the Eastern Conference of the Lingerie Football League (LFL). The team was the successor to the New York Euphoria.

The Majesty was one of the ten inaugural teams established in 2009 as part of the Lingerie Bowl's expansion into a full-fledged league. Despite its "New York" name, home games were played at the Sovereign Center in Reading, Pennsylvania, over 100 miles from New York City and New York State, and is not located within the New York metropolitan area. The team was originally meant to play in the Nassau Coliseum on Long Island, but a lease deal could not be secured.

On November 13, 2009, New York Majesty quarterback Krystal Gray, who had originally signed with the Chicago Bliss before being traded to New York in order to build the Majesty's offense, was involved in a multiple-player brawl during a game against the Miami Caliente in Florida. The fight was instigated by a taunt from Morgan McGrath of the Caliente and followed by physical altercations with Anonka Dixon, Taira Turley, and Tina Caccavale. Gray was ejected from play and suspended for one game. Tina Caccavale and Taira Turley of the Miami Caliente were also ejected for throwing punches, but not suspended. The Caliente won 49–7.

For the Majesty's final game, the team was coached by Henry Racich, owner of the semi-professional football team Conshohocken (Pennsylvania) Steelers, and Dan Esposito, formerly of the Washington Redskins and New Orleans Saints.

The Majesty suspended operations shortly after the 2009–10 season, due to what LFL founder Mitchell Mortaza described as "off-the-field distractions" and the fact that the team's home stadium was not in New York. Mortaza stated in 2012 that New York was one of six finalists for three potential expansion franchises, the other five being Pittsburgh, Pennsylvania; Boston, Massachusetts; Atlanta, Georgia; Houston, Texas; and Portland, Oregon.
