= Holdin' My Own Tour =

2017 concert tour by Eric Church

- Tour by Eric Church
- Associated album: Mr. Misunderstood
- Start date: January 13, 2017
- End date: May 27, 2017
- Legs: 1
- No. of shows: 62 in North America

Eric Church concert chronology
- The Outsiders World Tour (2016); Holdin' My Own Tour (2017)

The Holdin' My Own Tour was a headline concert tour by Eric Church, in support of his fifth studio album Mr. Misunderstood (2015). The tour began in Lincoln, Nebraska on January 13, 2017 and concluded in Nashville, Tennessee on May 27 of that year.

== Background ==
Church announced the Holdin' My Own Tour during a performance at Red Rocks Amphitheatre in Morrison, Colorado through a Facebook Live stream. Unlike his previous tours, Church said he will not have supporting acts, and instead, he will headline two fulls sets with an intermission in between sets. Basically at this point in his career, only Eric Church opens for Eric Church.

=== Battle Against Ticket Scalpers ===
Notoriously outspoken about his disgust with scalpers, Church and his team have come up with an intricate digital system that aims to ensure all tickets are sold at face value — and thus kept out of scalpers' hands. On February 21, 2017, Church had to cancel 25,000 tickets purchased by scalpers. Church stated:

It drives me fucking crazy… The problem I have is that scalpers have a bazillion people working for them. And they have those bots that scan. So it's not fair. I've been told to raise my prices. But there's guys out there that want to come to a show and bring their family to a show and are working a blue-collar job, they were there for us in bars and clubs, so I should raise to $100 because that's what the scalpers think? I refuse to believe that.

== Tour dates ==
List of concerts, showing date, city, country, venue, tickets sold, number of available tickets and amount of gross revenue
Date	City	Country	Venue	Attendance	Revenue
North America
January 13, 2017	Lincoln	United States	Pinnacle Bank Arena	14,097 / 14,097	$845,327
January 14, 2017	Sioux Falls	United States	Denny Sanford Premier Center	11,487 / 11,487	$737,885
January 15, 2017	Grand Forks	United States	Ralph Engelstad Arena	11,091 / 11,091	$637,362
January 19, 2017	Des Moines	United States	Wells Fargo Arena	14,918 / 14,918	$908,282
January 20, 2017	Minneapolis	United States	Target Center	18,344 / 18,344	$986,291
January 21, 2017	Green Bay	United States	Resch Center	9,865 / 9,865	$707,051
January 25, 2017	Philadelphia	United States	Wells Fargo Center	13,367 / 13,367	$810,658
January 27, 2017	Brooklyn	United States	Barclays Center	16,705 / 16,705	$1,017,290
January 28, 2017	Boston	United States	TD Garden	16,697 / 16,697	$1,018,761
January 31, 2017	Kansas City	United States	Sprint Center	17,076 / 17,076	$1,044,361
February 2, 2017	Tulsa	United States	BOK Center	12,291 / 12,291	$734,055
February 3, 2017	Dallas	United States	American Airlines Center	18,002 / 18,002	$969,385
February 4, 2017	North Little Rock	United States	Verizon Arena	16,706 / 16,706	$863,068
February 16, 2017	Duluth	United States	Infinite Energy Arena	12,228 / 12,228	$855,102
February 17, 2017	Birmingham	United States	Legacy Arena	17,031 / 17,031	$899,884
February 18, 2017	Southaven	United States	Landers Center	9,809 / 9,809	$615,193
February 23, 2017	Indianapolis	United States	Bankers Life Fieldhouse	15,339 / 15,339	$965,478
February 24, 2017	Cleveland	United States	Quicken Loans Arena	19,837 / 19,837	$1,036,893
February 25, 2017	Auburn Hills	United States	The Palace of Auburn Hills	18,940 / 18,940	$1,233,087
February 28, 2017	London	Canada	Budweiser Gardens	9,506 / 9,506	$516,983
March 2, 2017	Toronto	Canada	Air Canada Centre	16,405 / 16,405	$868,865
March 3, 2017	Ottawa	Canada	Canadian Tire Centre	15,084 / 15,084	$721,926
March 4, 2017	Montreal	Canada	Bell Centre	—	—
March 7, 2017	Winnipeg	Canada	MTS Centre	—	—
March 9, 2017	Saskatoon	Canada	SaskTel Centre	—	—
March 10, 2017	Edmonton	Canada	Northlands Coliseum	13,246 / 13,246	$707,750
March 11, 2017	Calgary	Canada	Scotiabank Saddledome	13,786 / 13,786	$766,972
March 14, 2017	Vancouver	Canada	Rogers Arena	14,614 / 14,614	$755,204
March 16, 2017	Portland	United States	Moda Center	13,127 / 13,127	$869,254
March 17, 2017	Spokane	United States	Spokane Veterans Memorial Arena	11,415 / 11,415	$701,672
March 18, 2017	Tacoma	United States	Tacoma Dome	19,030 / 19,030	$1,126,710
March 22, 2017	Bozeman	United States	Brick Breeden Fieldhouse	7,754 / 7,754	$562,206
March 24, 2017	Boise	United States	Taco Bell Arena	9,647 / 9,647	$541,050
March 25, 2017	Salt Lake City	United States	Vivint Smart Home Arena	12,354 / 12,354	$659,159
March 28, 2017	Phoenix	United States	Talking Stick Resort Arena	16,103 / 16,103	$929,427
March 30, 2017	Sacramento	United States	Golden 1 Center	16,266 / 16,266	$905,242
March 31, 2017	Los Angeles	United States	Staples Center	16,596 / 16,596	$1,042,599
April 4, 2017	Casper	United States	Casper Events Center	7,097 / 7,097	$337,410
April 5, 2017	Denver	United States	Pepsi Center	16,351 / 16,351	$1,099,179
April 7, 2017	Wichita	United States	Intrust Bank Arena	13,105 / 13,105	$650,701
April 8, 2017	Omaha	United States	CenturyLink Center Omaha	16,533 / 16,533	$1,059,369
April 12, 2017	Moline	United States	iWireless Center	9,690 / 9,690	$624,213
April 13, 2017	Rosemont	United States	Allstate Arena	16,553 / 16,553	$1,085,383
April 14, 2017	Milwaukee	United States	BMO Harris Bradley Center	17,931 / 17,931	$1,102,384
April 20, 2017	Buffalo	United States	KeyBank Center	14,994 / 14,994	$762,542
April 21, 2017	Pittsburgh	United States	PPG Paints Arena	18,138 / 18,138	$1,173,548
April 22, 2017	Cincinnati	United States	U.S. Bank Arena	16,736 / 16,736	$1,322,826
April 27, 2017	Uncasville	United States	Mohegan Sun Arena	16,461 / 16,461	$1,123,152
April 28, 2017	Uncasville	United States	Mohegan Sun Arena	16,461 / 16,461	$1,123,152
April 29, 2017	Manchester	United States	SNHU Arena	10,675 / 10,675	$679,563
May 4, 2017	Tampa	United States	Amalie Arena	15,890 / 15,890	$928,671
May 5, 2017	Jacksonville	United States	Jacksonville Veterans Memorial Arena	13,854 / 13,854	$924,966
May 6, 2017	Greenville	United States	Bon Secours Wellness Arena	14,447 / 14,447	$1,081,681
May 11, 2017	Grand Rapids	United States	Van Andel Arena	11,574 / 11,574	$857,408
May 12, 2017	Peoria	United States	Peoria Civic Center	10,568 / 10,568	$693,755
May 13, 2017	St. Louis	United States	Scottrade Center	18,250 / 18,250	$1,199,824
May 18, 2017	Reading	United States	Santander Arena	8,500 / 8,500	$650,722
May 19, 2017	Washington, D.C.	United States	Verizon Center	16,113 / 16,113	$1,100,193
May 20, 2017	Greensboro	United States	Greensboro Coliseum	20,313 / 20,313	$1,162,223
May 25, 2017	Louisville	United States	KFC Yum! Center	—	—
May 26, 2017	Nashville	United States	Bridgestone Arena	—	—
May 27, 2017	Nashville	United States	Bridgestone Arena	—	—
Total				—	—
