= Santander Arena =

Sports arena in Pennsylvania, U.S.

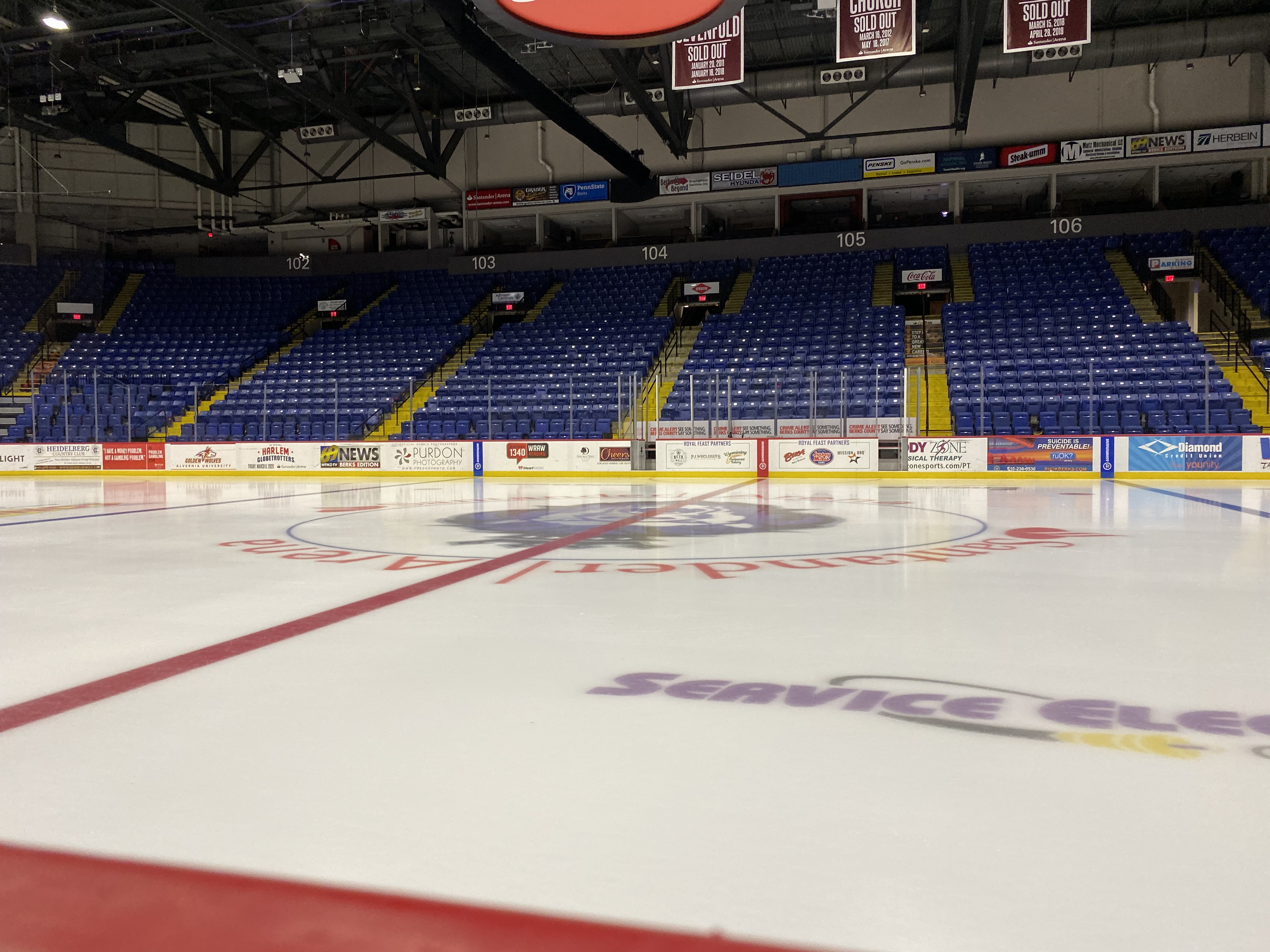
- The inside of the arena, taken from the Visitor bench

- Location within Pennsylvania Location within the United States
- Former names: Sovereign Center (2001–2013)
- Location: 700 Penn Street; Reading, Pennsylvania 19602
- Coordinates: 40°20′05″N 75°55′23″W
- Operator: ASM Global
- Capacity: 6,000–9,000 (concerts); 8,000 (basketball); 6,500 (ice hockey); 1,752 (performing arts center)
- Surface: Multi-surface
- Public transit: BARTA bus: All routes at BARTA Transportation Center

Construction
- Groundbreaking: June 1999
- Opened: September 6, 2001
- Cost: $42.5 million ($77.3 million in 2025 dollars)
- Architects: STV Architects Inc. PBK Architects Inc.
- Project manager: Turner Construction
- General contractor: Schlegel Builders Inc.

Tenants
- Reading Royals (ECHL) (2001–present); Reading Express (AIFL/AIFA/IFL) (2006–2012); Reading Railers (PBL) (2008); New York Majesty (LFL) (2009–2010); Reading Rockets (PLL) (2012); Pennsylvania Roar (MISL) (2013–2014); ASI Panthers (AIF) (2015); Pennsylvania Benjamins (IAL) (2026)

The Santander Arena (formerly known as the Sovereign Center) is a 7,160-seat multi-purpose arena, in Reading, Pennsylvania. It was built in 2001. The arena sits on the former site of the Astor Theater; one of several grand movie and theater palaces built in Reading in the early 20th century. Closed in 1975, the theater sat vacant for over two decades. In 1998, the Astor was demolished to make room for the Santander Arena. Early in construction, steps were taken to retain mementos of the Astor, including its ornate Art Deco chandelier and gates. These are on display and in use inside the arena corridors, allowing insight into the ambience of the former movie house.

The Santander Arena is owned by the Berks County Convention Center Authority and managed by OVG Hospitality. In 2000, the Rajah Shrine Theater was purchased, and after a thorough restoration and updating of the facilities was renamed the Sovereign Performing Arts Center. The Reading Eagle Theater is part of the complex.

On October 13, 2013, the building's name was changed from Sovereign Center to Santander Arena.

The arena is home to the Reading Royals ice hockey team in the ECHL as well as the Alvernia University Golden Wolves ice hockey team of the NCAA DIII. It was formerly home to the Reading Railers basketball team, the New York Majesty Lingerie Football League team, the Reading Rockets box lacrosse team, and the Reading Express indoor football team.

The arena has hosted Jehovah's Witnesses District Conventions from 2005 to 2013 and the renamed Regional Conventions of Jehovah's Witnesses from 2015 to 2019, then again in 2023.

== Features ==
The arena contains 701 club seats and 20 luxury suites.

The arena offers 25,200 square feet (2,340 m^{2}) of banquet space on the arena floor. With seating for up to 1,200 guests, the Santander Arena can accommodate large functions as well as smaller ones using the Reading Eagle Theater at the Santander Arena setup. The arena also offers a multipurpose room which measures 4,575 square feet (425.0 m^{2}) and accommodate functions for up to 200 guests.

With the exception of the suites, all seats are standard chairbacks and there is a center-hung videoboard which also functions as a scoreboard for hockey and other sporting events. The seating bowl is surrounded by a concourse which features generic concessions as well as local vendors such as Pennsylvania-based Chickie's & Pete's.

== Notable events ==
- Phish performed at Santander on October 29, 2013, as part of their Fall Tour. This performance is widely considered the stand-out night of that year’s Fall run.
- Trey Anastasio Band & Goose performed at Santander on November 19, 2022.
- Barenaked Ladies performed for the first time in Reading at the arena on November 21, 2001.
- The PBR hosted a Built Ford Tough Series event at this venue in 2006.
- Skate America was held at the arena in 2003 and 2007.
- Slipknot, Korn, and King 810 performed in 2014.
- Day one of the East Coast Tsunami Fest 2015, featuring Wu Tang Clan, Mobb Deep, Bodycount w Ice-T, Wisdom In Chains, Turnstile and more, will be held here on Friday, September 25.
- Louis C.K Performed on June 9, 2016 as part of his stand up tour.
- Rascal Flatts & Chase Bryant performed as part of Rascal Flatts "Rhythm & Roots Tour" on October 8, 2016.
- Eric Church performed as part of his Holdin' My Own Tour on May 18, 2017.
- Avenged Sevenfold performed as part of their "The Stage World Tour" on January 16, 2018.
- Hot Wheels Monster Trucks Live made their first appearance here on May 21 & 22, 2022.
- LOONA performed at Santander as a part of the Loonatheworld Tour on August 15, 2022.
- Sum 41 performed at Santander as part of their Tour of the Setting Sum on May 9, 2024
