= Santander Performing Arts Center =

Historic theatre in Reading, Pennsylvania

- Rajah Theatre; Rajah Temple
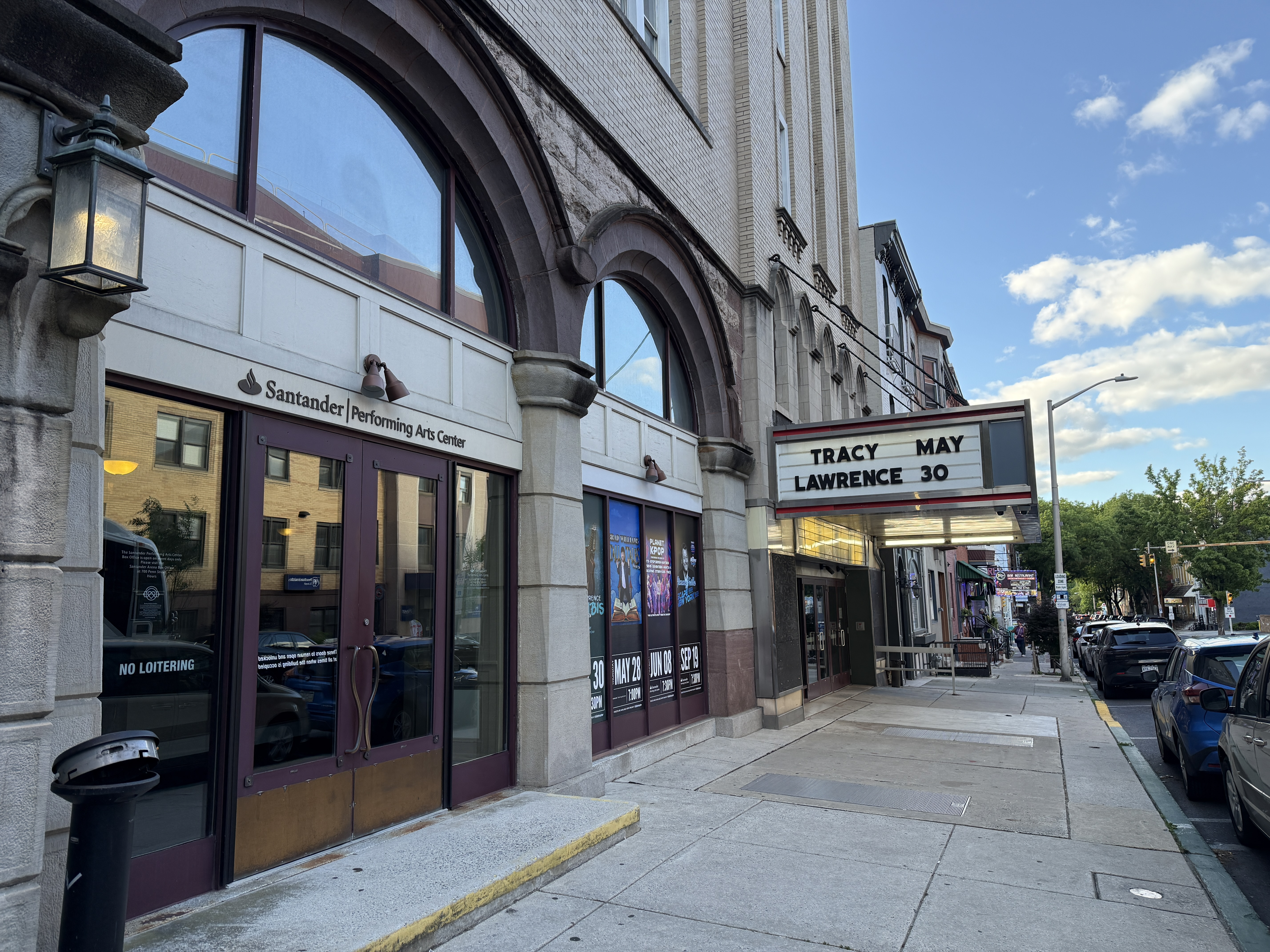
- Entrance to the Santander Performing Arts Center
- Interactive map of Santander Performing Arts Center
- Address: 136 N. 6th Street; Reading, Pennsylvania; United States
- Coordinates: 40°20′16″N 75°55′34″W
- Owner: Santander Bank
- Capacity: 1,752
- Type: Regional

Construction
- Years active: 1922-present

The Santander Performing Arts Center (formerly known as the Rajah Theatre or Rajah Temple, and Sovereign Performing Arts Center) is a historic theatre in Reading, Pennsylvania, United States. It is the current home of the Reading Symphony Orchestra and the "Broadway on 6th St" annual series of musicals and plays.

== History ==
Built in 1922 under the name The Rajah Temple, it was second structure owned by the Shriners that operated as a dual purpose public theatre and temple for the masons in the city of Reading and the third building to be known as the Rajah Temple. The first Rajah Temple was originally the St. Matthew Lutheran Church property at Pearl and Franklin Streets, which was purchased by the Shriners in 1892. In 1917 the Shriners purchased the Academy of Music, a theatre in Reading, and relocated their temple to that location where it continued to operate as the Rajah Temple and Rajah Theatre for public performances and freemason events. That structure was destroyed by fire on May 21, 1921.

In November 1922 construction began on the current theatre. It operated as a performance arts venue for vaudeville, operas, concerts, plays, and a movie theatre at various times during the 20th century. In 2000 the Berks County Convention Center Authority oversaw the acquisition and renovation of the theatre by Sovereign Bank; who rebranded the theater as the Sovereign Performing Arts Center. Sovereign Bank was rebranded as Santander Bank on October 17, 2013; and the performing arts center for which it has naming rights were also rebranded. It is now the home of the Reading Symphony Orchestra and the "Broadway on 6th St" annual series of musicals and plays.
