= Bob Hewko =

American football player (born 1960)

No. 8
- Position: Quarterback

Personal information
- Born: June 8, 1960 (age 66); Abington, Pennsylvania, U.S.
- Listed height: 6 ft 3 in (1.91 m)
- Listed weight: 195 lb (88 kg)

Career information
- High school: Upper Moreland (Willow Grove, Pennsylvania)
- College: Florida
- NFL draft: 1983: undrafted

Career history
- Tampa Bay Buccaneers (1983); Dallas Cowboys (1985)*
- * Offseason or practice squad member only
- Stats at Pro Football Reference

Robert Todd Hewko (born June 8, 1960) is a former American football quarterback who played for the Florida Gators and had a brief career in the National Football League (NFL). He later worked as a color commentator for the Legends Football League, an arena football executive, and in entertainment management.

== Early life ==
Hewko was born in Abington, Pennsylvania, and attended Upper Moreland High School in Willow Grove. He was a standout four-sport athlete in football, basketball, baseball, and track. He started at quarterback for three years and was named All-Suburban One League, all-state, and All-America. In 2017, he was inducted into the Upper Moreland High School Sports Hall of Fame.

== College career ==
Hewko played college football at the University of Florida from 1978 to 1982. He was the first out-of-state quarterback recruited by assistant coach Steve Spurrier under head coach Doug Dickey.

He started the first three games of the 1980 season as a sophomore but suffered a knee injury and was replaced by Wayne Peace. He underwent multiple knee surgeries during his college career.

Hewko is best remembered for his relief role in the 1982 Florida–Florida State game. Inserted in the second half with Florida trailing 10–0 on a rainy field, he completed 6 of 10 passes for 66 yards, scored a 10-yard touchdown run to tie the game, and held for Jim Gainey's game-winning 22-yard field goal as time expired, giving the Gators a 13–10 victory.

== Professional career ==
Hewko went undrafted in the 1983 NFL Draft and signed with the Tampa Bay Buccaneers. He appeared in two games that season (both losses) but did not start or throw a pass. He later spent time with the Dallas Cowboys in 1985 as an offseason or practice squad member.

== Post-playing career ==
=== Broadcasting ===
In 2012, Hewko joined the Legends Football League (LFL, formerly Lingerie Football League) as a color commentator, replacing Sean Salisbury. He has worked alongside Mitch Mortaza and others on YouTube broadcasts.

=== Arena football and business ===
Hewko served as executive vice president of RockStar Investment Group. In April 2014, the group (which included business partner Vince Neil of Mötley Crüe) acquired the Jacksonville Sharks of the Arena Football League.

In 2015, RockStar Investment Group and its principals (including Hewko) faced a lawsuit from an investor alleging fraud related to attempts to launch a Las Vegas AFL franchise (the Outlaws).

=== Entertainment ===
Hewko has also held roles in hospitality and entertainment, including with Caesars Entertainment.

== Personal life ==
Hewko resides in Florida and has remained active as a University of Florida football alumnus.

== Honors ==
=== High School ===
- All-Suburban One League
- All-State (Pennsylvania)
- All-America honors
- Parade All-American QB
- Upper Moreland High School Sports Hall of Fame (2017)
