= Miami Caliente =

Logo

General information
- Founded: 2009
- Folded: 2011
- Stadium: BankAtlantic Center (2009–2010); FIU Stadium (2010–2011)
- Headquartered: Sunrise, Florida; Miami, Florida
- Colors: Teal, orange and white
- Website: www.lflus.com/miamicaliente/

Personnel
- Owners: Lingerie Football League, LLC
- Head coach: Bob Hewko

League / conference affiliations
- Lingerie Football League; Eastern Division

The Miami Caliente was a women's American football team in the Lingerie Football League based in the Miami area. They were part of the Lingerie Bowl's expansion into a full-fledged league in 2009 with home games at the BankAtlantic Center in Sunrise, Florida. Head coach Bob Hewko was a quarterback for the University of Florida and a back-up quarterback for the Tampa Bay Buccaneers.

On November 13, 2009, Taira Turley and Tina Caccavale were ejected from a game for fighting when a multiple-player brawl, instigated by Morgan McGrath, erupted near the end of the game against the New York Majesty. Krystal Gray of the Majesty was also ejected and suspended for one game.

The Caliente reached the 2009–10 Eastern Conference championship game on February 4, 2010, at the Seminole Hard Rock Hotel and Casino in Hollywood, Florida, but lost 20–7 to the Chicago Bliss.

The Caliente played one more season, moving outdoors to FIU Stadium, before ceasing operations in 2011.

== Roster ==
Miami Caliente roster
Quarterbacks: 12 Anonka Dixon; Running backs: 1 Etta Paul; Wide receivers: 11 Tina Caccavale; Offensive Linewomen: 13 Ashley Thames; 4 Kaley Tuning; 8 Taylor Thompson; 9 Guensie Grecy; 15 Janae Johnson	Defensive Linewomen: 5 Jessica Nelson; 10 Ashley Helmstetter; 16 Vonshari Hoardes; 18 Annik Nayler; Linebackers: 20 Taira Turley; Defensive backs: 4 Nina Smith S; 3 Jennifer Grenier CB; 6 Claudia Gomez CB; 17 Daniella Williams CB; Roster updated 2010-10-30
