= 1972 Ohio State-Minnesota Brawl =

Ohio State-Minnesota Brawl
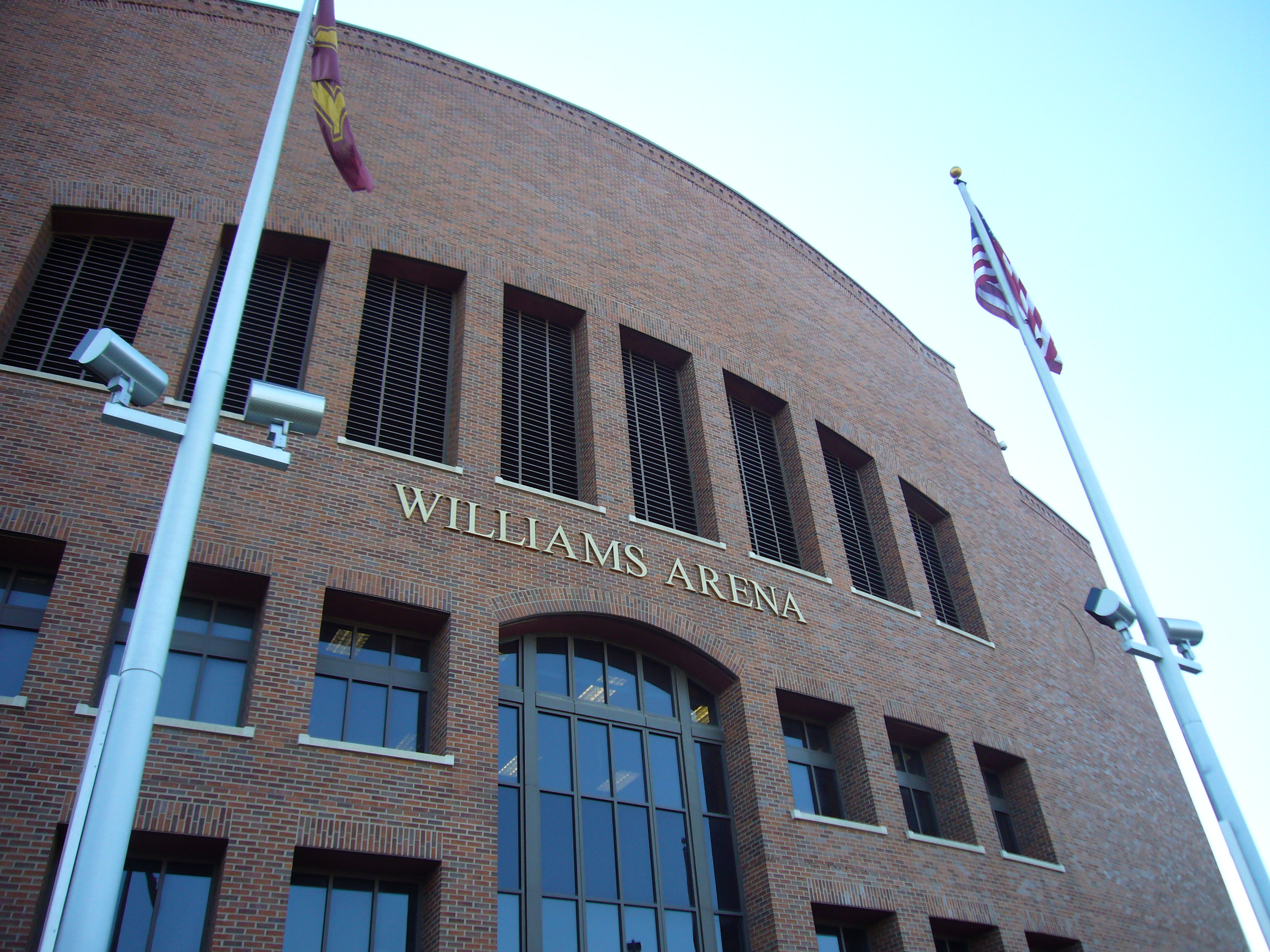
- Williams Arena, where the brawl took place
Minnesota Golden Gophers	Ohio State Buckeyes
44	50
Head coach: Bill Musselman	Head coach: Fred Taylor
- Game called off with 36 seconds remaining in the second half
- Date: January 25, 1972
- Venue: Williams Arena, Minneapolis, Minnesota, U.S.

The Ohio State-Minnesota Brawl is an infamous 1972 college basketball game between the Ohio State Buckeyes and the Minnesota Golden Gophers at Williams Arena in Minnesota. During the second half of the game, with 36 seconds to go, Ohio State player, Luke Witte, was fouled while going to the basket by Minnesota's Corky Taylor, who went on to punch Witte in the face, leading to a large brawl breaking out. 3 Buckeyes players were taken to the hospital afterwards.

== The fight ==
At the time, it was late in the second half of the game.The Buckeyes, 50. The Golden Gophers, 44. Ohio State player, Luke Witte, was going to the basket, when he was fouled hard by Minnesota player, Corky Taylor. While Luke was dazed, Corky would punch him in the face, and then knee him in the groin. Gopher reserve Ron Behagen, then ran over and stomped on Witte's neck and head several times, knowing him unconscious. Benches cleared and a large brawl erupted. Two more Gophers, Jim Brewer and future Baseball Hall of Famer Dave Winfield, then attacked several other Ohio State players.

The game was eventually called off with 36 seconds remaining, giving the Buckeyes the win. As Luke Witte was taken off the court on a stretcher, he was booed by Minnesota fans. Three Ohio State players, Luke Witte, Mark Wagar, and Mark Minor, were taken to the hospital after the game.

Minnesota Golden Gophers coach, Bill Musselman, would be dropped by the team as head coach at the end of the season due to the incident.
