= Reading Railers =

Former team of the Premier Basketball League

- Founded: 2006
- League: PBL 2007
- Team history: Reading Railers; 2007-2008
- Based in: Reading, Pennsylvania
- Arena: Sovereign Center
- Colors: black, orange, silver
- Owner: Kay Magee
- Head coach: Sal Mentesana
- Championships: 0

The Reading Railers were a team of the Premier Basketball League that began play in 2007. They played their home games at the Sovereign Center. The team was originally going to play in the American Basketball Association.

The Railers chose not to compete in the 2008-2009 PBL season.

The Railers did not come back for the 2009–2010 season and are regarded as defunct.
