= Perth Stadium =

Stadium in Perth, Western Australia

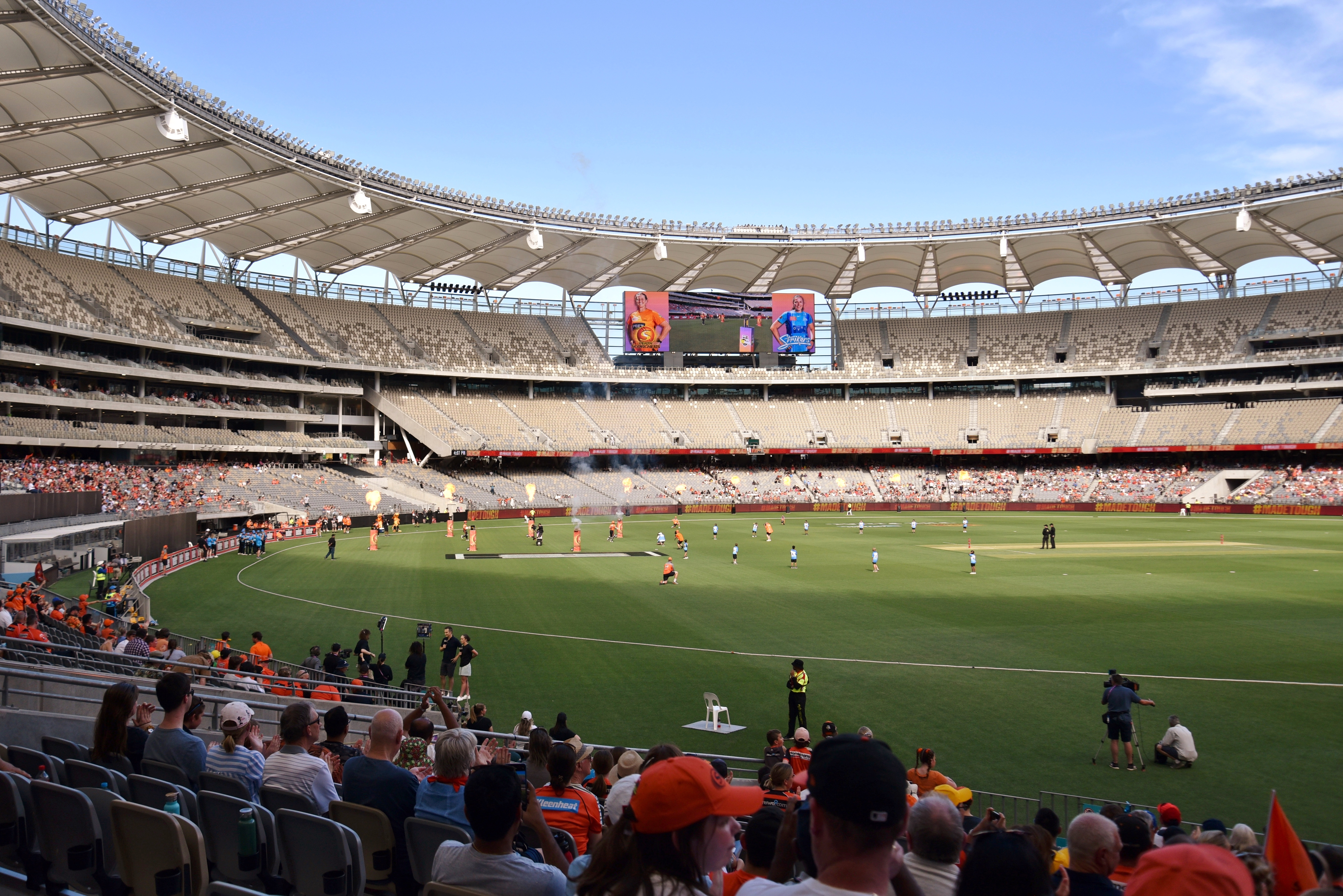
- View eastward in November 2021
- Interactive map of Perth Stadium
- Location: Burswood, Western Australia
- Coordinates: 31°57′4″S 115°53′21″E
- Owner: Government of Western Australia VenuesWest
- Operator: VenuesLive
- Capacity: 61,266; 65,000 (Rectangular); 75,000 (Concert)
- Surface: Stabilized turf
- Scoreboard: Yes
- Record attendance: 73,092, Ed Sheeran concert 12 March 2023
- Field size: 165 m × 130 m (180 yd × 142 yd) (AFL)
- Field shape: Oval
- Public transit: Perth Stadium; Perth Stadium

Construction
- Groundbreaking: December 2014
- Opened: 11 December 2017 (soft); 21 January 2018 (official)
- Cost: A$1.6 billion
- Architects: Hassell, HKS, Cox

Tenants
- Australian Football League West Coast Eagles (AFL) (2018–present); Fremantle Football Club (AFL) (2018–present) Cricket Australia national cricket team (2018–present); Perth Scorchers (BBL) (2018–present); Western Australia cricket team (occasional matches); Perth Scorchers Women (WBBL) (occasional matches) Rugby League Dolphins (NRL) (2023) Rugby Union Australia national rugby union team (selected matches)

Ground information
- Country: Australia
- End names
- North: WACA Member's End (cricket); West: River End (AFL) South: Langer Stand End (cricket); East: Train Station End (AFL)

International information
- First men's Test: 14–18 December 2018: Australia v India
- Last men's Test: 21–22 November 2025: Australia v England
- First men's ODI: 28 January 2018: Australia v England
- Last men's ODI: 19 October 2025: Australia v India
- First men's T20I: 8 November 2019: Australia v Pakistan
- Last men's T20I: 13 February 2024: Australia v West Indies
- As of 22 November 2025; Source: Cricinfo

Perth Stadium (known under naming rights as Optus Stadium) is a stadium located in the Perth suburb of Burswood. It is primarily used for Australian rules football and cricket as the home ground of the West Coast Eagles and the Fremantle Football Club in the Australian Football League (AFL) and the Perth Scorchers in the Big Bash League (BBL).

Perth Stadium's total capacity is 61,266, including standing room, extendable to 65,000 seats for rectangular sports. It is the third-largest stadium in Australia. It was built by a consortium led by Multiplex, and was completed during late 2017 and officially opened on 21 January 2018. Australian telecommunications company Optus has owned naming rights to the stadium since 2017, shortly before the stadiums opening.

Perth Stadium is set to host games during the 2027 Rugby World Cup, including the opening match and the Opening ceremony. The stadium has also hosted matches during the rugby league State of Origin series, and the Bledisloe Cup.

== History ==
=== Early proposals ===
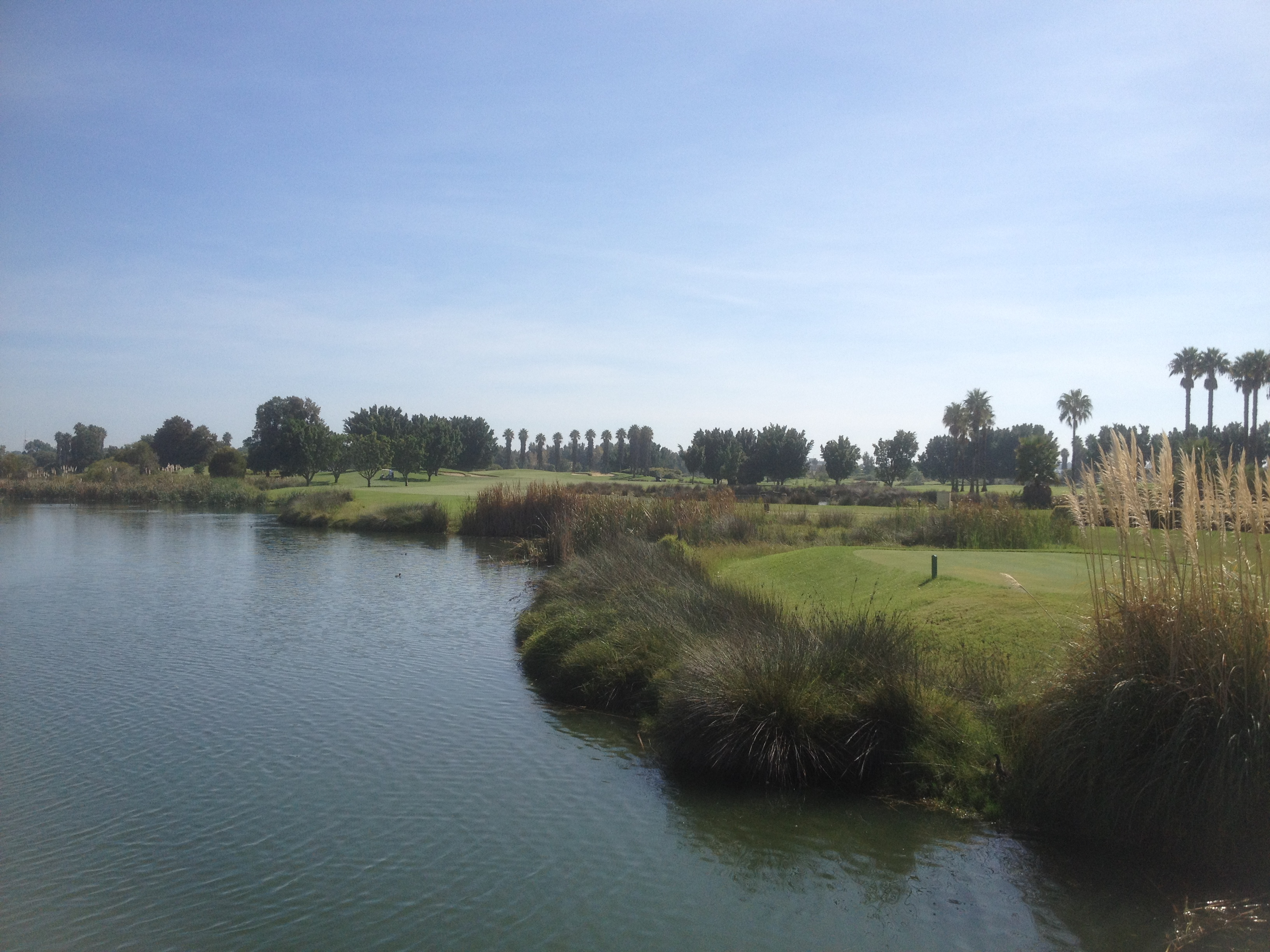
The Burswood Park Golf Course was closed and the stadium built on its northern end

In 2003, the Government of Western Australia led by Alan Carpenter approved Terms of Reference for a review to examine the future of major sporting venues in Western Australia with Terms of Reference approved in December 2003. Having spent 2004 working with Football and Cricket bodies to try and advance the project the Government decided, in 2005, to appoint a taskforce. It was chaired by John Langoulant, Chief Executive of the Chamber of Commerce and Industry of Western Australia, and included private sector experts in finance, planning and architecture working with Department of Sport and Recreation infrastructure experts and the Department's Chief Executive Officer, Ron Alexander. The taskforce released its final report in May 2007. The report recommended the construction of a new 60,000-seat stadium at either Kitchener Park (which adjoins Subiaco Oval) or in East Perth, which would be suitable for Australian rules football, cricket and also rectangular-field sports such as soccer, rugby union and rugby league. The taskforce recommended against the further development of Subiaco Oval, which would be demolished. It also recommended against building the new stadium at the site of Burswood, stating that "The development costs at the Burswood site would be significantly higher due to local site conditions and the need for significant upgrades to transport infrastructure."

In July 2007, the Government of Western Australia announced its preference to build a new 60,000-seat stadium rather than re-develop Subiaco Oval, and in early 2008 it confirmed that Subiaco Oval would be demolished for the new Perth super-stadium to be built next door at Kitchener Park. This site was chosen ahead of the other suggested site at the old East Perth Power Station, which was set aside to house a new $500 million museum.

The new stadium at Subiaco was scheduled to be built between 2011 and 2016, with the majority of the stadium to be completed in 2014. Subiaco Oval was to be demolished between 2014 and 2016 to allow the end of construction on Perth Stadium. The staged construction would have allowed for Australian rules football to be played at the new venue by 2014, when the stadium was two-thirds completed with an initial capacity of 40,000 seats. The final stage would be completed in 2016 and expand the stadium's capacity to 60,000.

Stadium plans suggested its playing surface would have been oval in shape to accommodate Australian rules football and cricket games. The stadium was also expected to have retractable seating which would have reconfigured the venue to make it suitable for rectangular-field sports codes, such as soccer, rugby union and rugby league. These retractable seats were to number 22,000, and were to be situated along the touch lines and behind the posts in the rectangular configuration. With an overall planned capacity of 60,000, Perth Stadium would have been Western Australia's largest sports venue, and it was designed to be built such that the capacity could be increased to 70,000 if needed in the future.

The stadium was expected to be primarily used for Australian rules football with the ability to host cricket, rugby union, rugby league and soccer matches. It was planned that it would be the home ground for the West Coast Eagles and Fremantle Dockers, the two Western Australian teams in the Australian Football League. It was also planned to host rugby union Test matches, soccer and rock concerts. In reality AFL matches have been joined by the AFLW games and WAFL grand finals.

The cost for the Kitchener Park stadium was expected to reach $1.1 billion, including $800 million on construction of the stadium itself and $300 million on associated infrastructure, property acquisition, escalation, transport infrastructure and other costs. Construction of the new stadium would have involved moving 27 private residences and moving residents from another 66 state housing properties surrounding Subiaco Oval. These state housing tenants would have been relocated within the Subiaco area. The project was going to be funded by the Government of Western Australia.

Following the election of a new State Government under Colin Barnett, the new stadium's plans were scrapped in early February 2009. Barnett stated that a new stadium would not be considered for at least two years. As a result of Australia's failed bid for the 2022 World Cup, $250 million in potential federal government funding for a new stadium was also withdrawn in December 2010.

=== Burswood location ===
In June 2011, the State Government announced that the new stadium would be built in Burswood on the northern section of the Burswood Park golf course. The government stated that the Burswood site was preferred because it was unconstrained by surrounding developments and had the additional benefit of being government-owned. It would also allow for a special events six-platform Perth Stadium railway station to be built and could be connected to the central business district via a pedestrian bridge across the Swan River to East Perth. A car park was not built to service the stadium, with visitors expected to either park in the city and walk across the bridge or use public transport.

The Government stated that planning for the new stadium at Burswood was due to be completed by mid-2012, with construction commencing in 2014 and scheduled for completion in 2018. It announced Multiplex as the contract holders for the construction of the stadium and appointed the firm Populous as the project's architectural consultants.

=== Construction ===
==== Cost ====
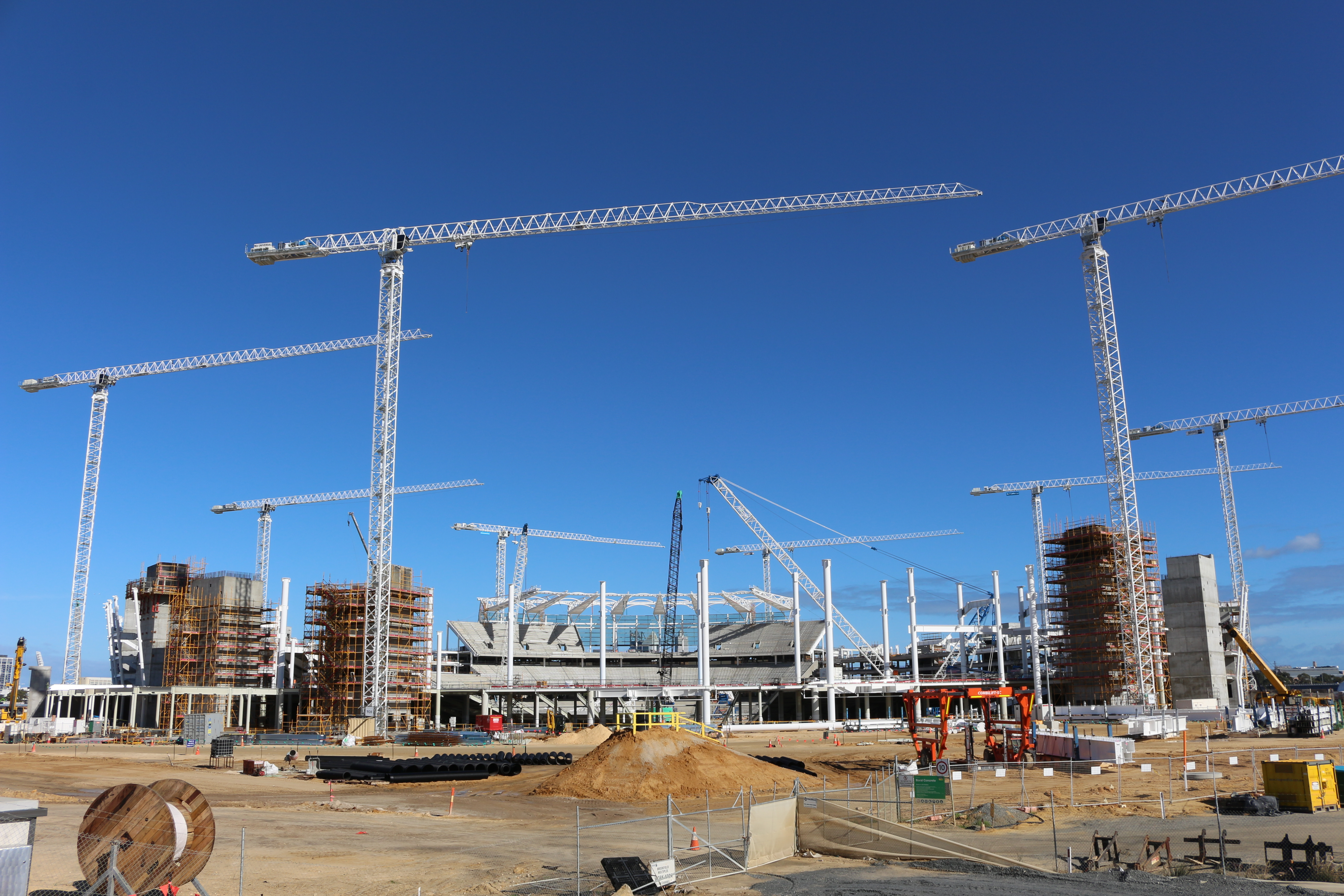
Perth Stadium under construction, photographed from Victoria Park Drive in May 2016

Following the Barnett Government's announcement to move the site of the proposed stadium to Burswood, it stated that the stadium would cost around $700 million, with an extra $300 million allocated to public transport works. However, in December 2011 Premier Colin Barnett stated that it was too early to say what the final cost would be, explaining that "No one can put a price on it until it's designed, until it goes out to tender".

The previous Government's Major Stadia Taskforce had earlier put the total cost of the Burswood stadium option, including transport needs, at $1.147 billion. This higher cost, comparative to the sites at Subiaco or East Perth, was mainly "due to the need to provide substantial transport infrastructure as well as the additional costs associated with site conditions (i.e. reclaimed flood plain and site previously used as the Perth Municipal Rubbish Dump which included industrial as well as domestic landfill up until 1971)." In June 2011 the West Australian newspaper reported that due to an increase in construction costs since the release of the task force report in 2007, the total cost will be close to $1.5 billion, assuming work begins within two years.

The Australian Football League agreed to help pay for Perth's new stadium at Burswood, although it was not revealed how much money it would contribute. However, the nearby Crown Perth, which is expected to benefit commercially from the presence of the stadium, was not asked by the Barnett Government to help meet the construction costs.

In October 2017 it was reported that the final cost of the completed stadium was $1.6 billion. This equated to an average cost per Western Australian household of $1500, and per person of $600. In February 2018 a State Government inquiry into Western Australia's finances under the former Barnett government found that the full cost of the stadium including transport infrastructure will be $1.8 billion, around $200 million more than previous estimates.

==== Impacts ====
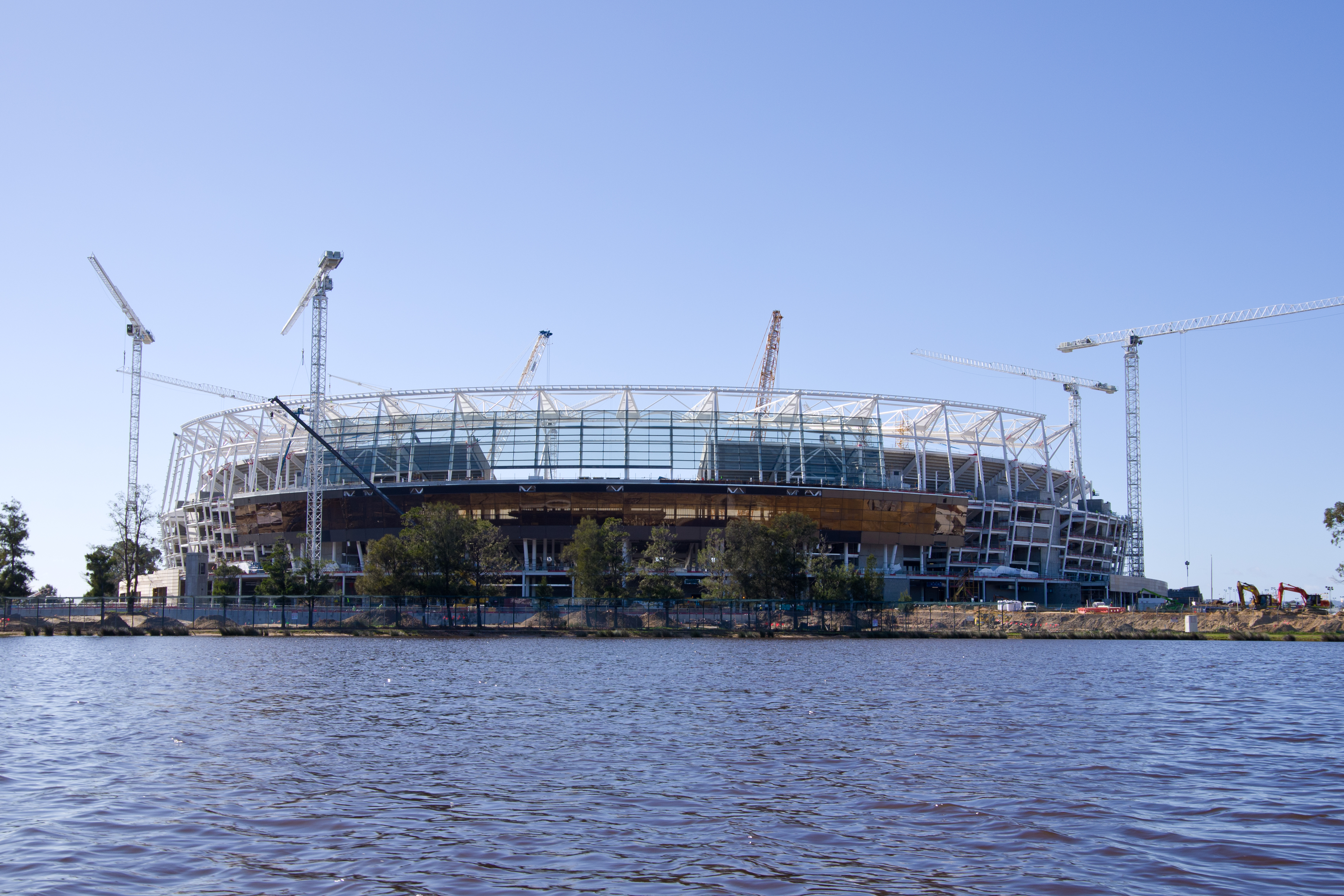
Perth Stadium under construction, photographed from East Perth in July 2016

The site is located on the Burswood Peninsula, previously known as the Swan Portland Cement Site. The Swan Portland Cement Company Ltd operated at the site from 1927 and James Hardie Industries operated at the adjacent site from the 1920s up until 1981. In its report and recommendations, Remediation and Redevelopment of the Swan Portland Cement Site, Burswood, (January 1998) the Environmental Protection Authority, states "The current site is contaminated with asbestos waste from the James Hardie operations and cement kiln dust, kiln bricks and associated contaminated soil and hydrocarbons from the Swan Portland cement operations." In its report it estimates 750 thousand cubic metres (26 million cubic feet) cement kiln dust on the site, the effects of which should be managed, with regard to its effects upon public health, groundwater and surface water. Three zones of asbestos contamination on the site were identified in the report; zone 1 having 68 thousand cubic metres (2.4 million cubic feet) of broken and loose asbestos, zone 2 having 150 thousand cubic metres (5.3 million cubic feet) of asbestos contamination up to 15 metres (49 ft) below ground level and zone 3 being 180 thousand cubic metres (6.4 million cubic feet) of asbestos contamination within 600 thousand cubic metres (21 million cubic feet) of cement kiln dust.

The EPA report states that while undisturbed in the soil, the contamination poses no threat to public health but disturbing the site will result in airborne asbestos fibres and contamination from the soil. The EPA recommended a management plan for any disturbance of asbestos contamination to be conducted by the Town of Victoria Park.

In November 2012, Victoria Park residents contacted the Health Department to notify them asbestos and other material had been unearthed by work on the southern parking lot of the Casino complex. Alarmed residents feared asbestos exposure to locals, park users and Casino patrons. Although the Health Department advised that no risk had been identified, stock piles were sprayed with hydromulch, windbreaks were put on fencing, contaminant levels were being monitored and paths and loose soil were sealed. The Premier's office advised that the Department of Building Management and Works were undertaking the project. The Health Department assured residents there was "no risk to the general public".

The construction of the stadium affected Aboriginal communities. Although the State Solicitor's Office advises that native title has been extinguished over the site, it has heritage significance for the local indigenous people, the Whadjuk Noongar, being a burial site. Despite the Department of Indigenous Affairs advising the existence of the registered Aboriginal Heritage site affecting the Burswood Peninsula and East Perth foreshore, the site was deregistered by the Barnett Liberal State Government. Following the Supreme Court decision Robinson v Fielding [2015] WASC 108 to reinstate DAA 22874 (Marapikurrinya Yintha – Port Hedland Harbour) after it had been deregistered by the Barnett government, the Burswood Island Burial site was reassessed in October 2016 but remains "Not a Site" under the Aboriginal Heritage Act (AHA). Previously the site was recognised by the Department of Aboriginal Affairs under the Aboriginal Heritage Act 1972 (AHA) as DAA site 15914: Burswood Island Burial. "Several culturally significant sites around WA have had their protection withdrawn in the past year on the basis they no longer fit the definition of a sacred site. Guidelines issued by the Department of Aboriginal Affairs stated that to be a recognised as sacred site, a place needs to have been devoted to religious use rather than simply mythological stories, songs or beliefs."

=== Opening ===
The first event to be held at the stadium was a Twenty20 cricket match between the Perth Scorchers and the England Lions on 11 December 2017, followed by a second match between the same teams two days later. It was officially opened to the public on 21 January 2018 with a free open day for the community.

== Naming rights ==
The original Perth Stadium logo

During construction, then-Premier Colin Barnett had maintained that the government would not be selling the naming rights for the stadium as it would "not be appropriate for such a significant piece of State-owned infrastructure". Instead he suggested a name such as "Swan Stadium" or "River Stadium" – named after the adjacent Swan River – would be more appropriate. Ultimately, the name Perth Stadium was settled on as it was more representative of Western Australia. In the lead up to the state election in March 2017, Labor, then in opposition, announced that it would sell the naming rights for both Perth Stadium and Perth Arena as part of a plan to return the state budget to surplus if it were to win government.

Despite initially suggesting it might retain the Perth Stadium name or at least retain "Perth" in any naming rights arrangement, the new McGowan government announced on 8 November 2017 that the stadium would be officially known as Optus Stadium. Optus, the second-largest telecommunications company in Australia, and the state government agreed to a 10-year naming rights deal that is thought to be worth approximately $50 million in value.

For international cricket matches, the stadium is known as Perth Stadium, due to Cricket Australia’s contractual obligations.

== Facilities ==
=== Architecture and design ===
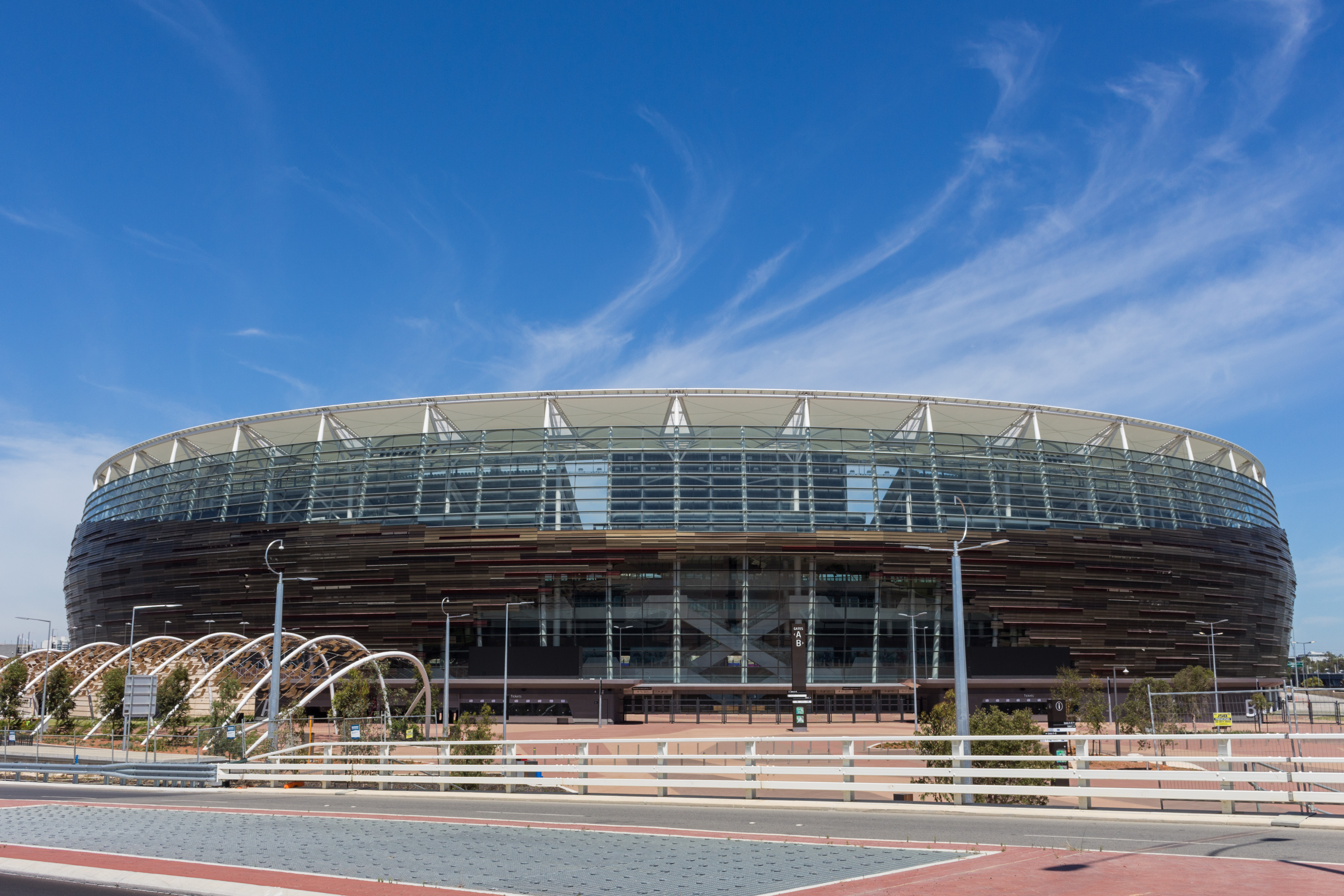
Exterior view of the stadium in December 2017, its stylistic brown facade visible

As with the earlier plans for the new stadium at Kitchener Park, the stadium seats over 60,000 spectators, with the ability to seat up to 70,000 in rectangular mode. Initially in the early design stages, it was hoped the venue could have the potential to expand to 80,000 seats in the future by adding a third tier along one wing and another tier on the opposite side of the ground each holding 10,000 seats. Even at 61,266, Perth Stadium still has the third-biggest capacity of any stadium in the country, behind the Melbourne Cricket Ground and Stadium Australia.

The stadium's roof comprises a lightweight membrane textile that covers 85% of the seats. It is supported by cantilevered trusses to give a halo effect, with all columns located behind the seating area. The field is 165 m (541 ft) long and 130 m (430 ft) wide, 5 m (16 ft) longer than both the Melbourne Cricket Ground and Docklands Stadium in Melbourne, but 10 m (33 ft) shorter than Subiaco Oval which was 175 by 122 m (574 by 400 ft).

It is a multi-purpose facility able to hold not only sporting events such as Australian rules football and major rugby league, rugby union, cricket and soccer games, but major cultural events such as concerts and other entertainment events. During the Test Cricket match in December 2019, a temporary swimming pool was installed, similar to the one at The Gabba.

=== Technology ===
Perth Stadium is equipped with a range of state-of-the-art technological features designed to enhance the fan experience. The stadium uses various types of technology, including digital ticketing, sensor-equipped turnstiles, and a stadium app offering real-time information. There are two 340 m^{2} (3,700 sq ft) screens on either end of the stadium and over 1,000 TV screens located within the stadium. Perth Stadium provides robust connectivity through a multi-layer network built on Cisco's industrial-grade Wi-Fi 6 access points. Additionally, Telstra enhances the coverage by blanketing the stadium in 5G signal.

=== Food and amenities ===
The stadium is serviced by over 50 food and beverage outlets, with patrons able to follow on-field action on TV screens. Fans will never be more than 40 metres (130 ft) away from a bar or food outlet, with 75 percent of food supplied from locally owned and operated businesses. The Camfield, a large pub, microbrewery and function centre, is located outside the stadium and open seven days a week.

The stadium has 748 male, 781 female and 60 accessible toilets. Security features include an on-site police station, 650 CCTV cameras around the stadium and surrounding precinct, and freestanding metal detectors at the stadium.

In February 2021 a rooftop tour branded "Halo" was opened at the stadium, allowing participants to walk around the stadium's roof. In August 2021 a new viewing platform began construction on top of the roof on the western side of the stadium. The wheelchair accessible platform, which resembles a pull tab from above, projects 5 metres (16 ft) beyond both sides of the stadium roof and also features a section where visitors can lean over the playing field below while wearing a safety harness. The platform and the attraction – branded "Vertigo" – both opened in March 2022.

=== Transport ===
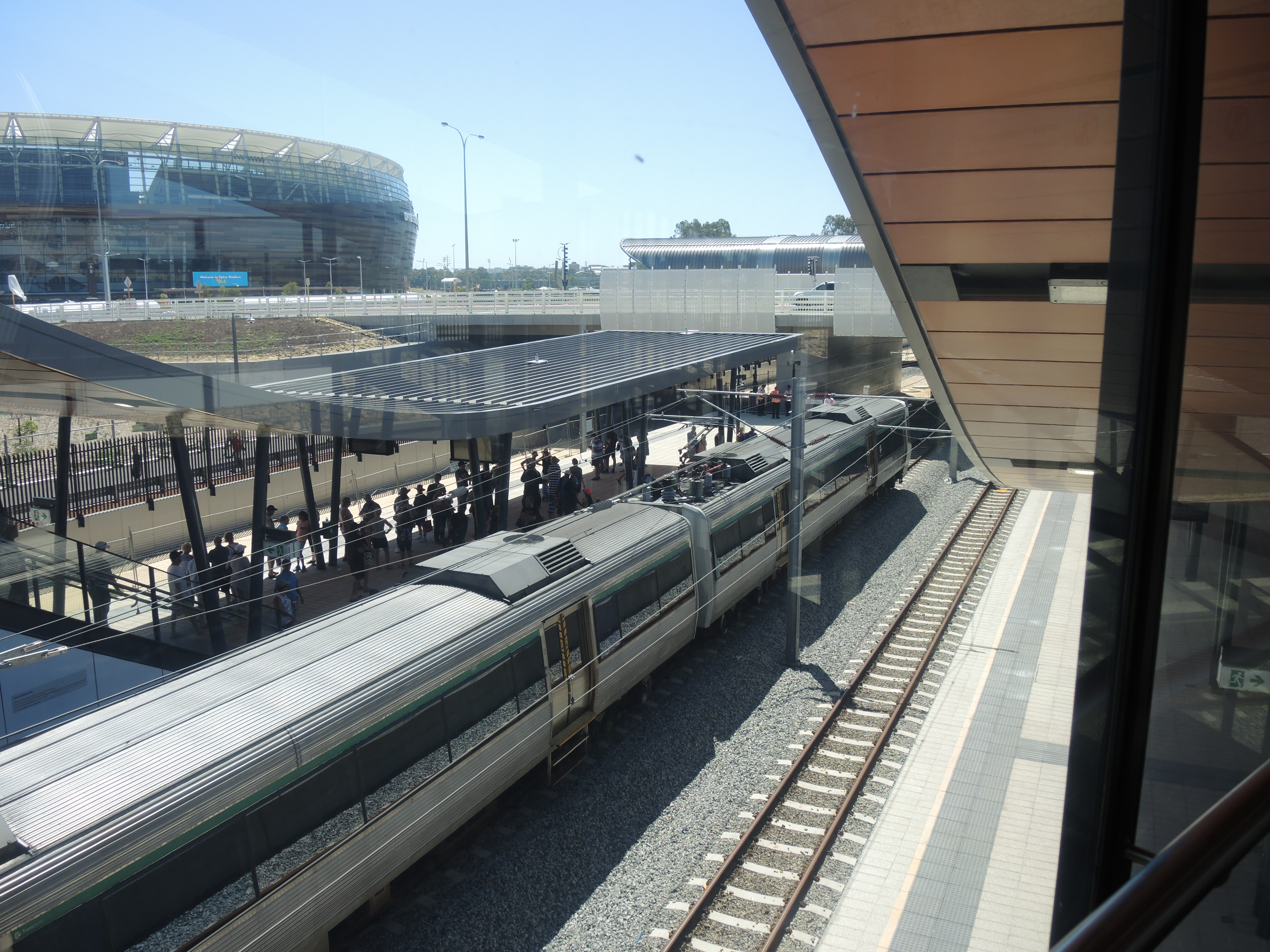
The purpose-built Perth Stadium railway station, serviced by Transperth's Armadale and Thornlie Line services

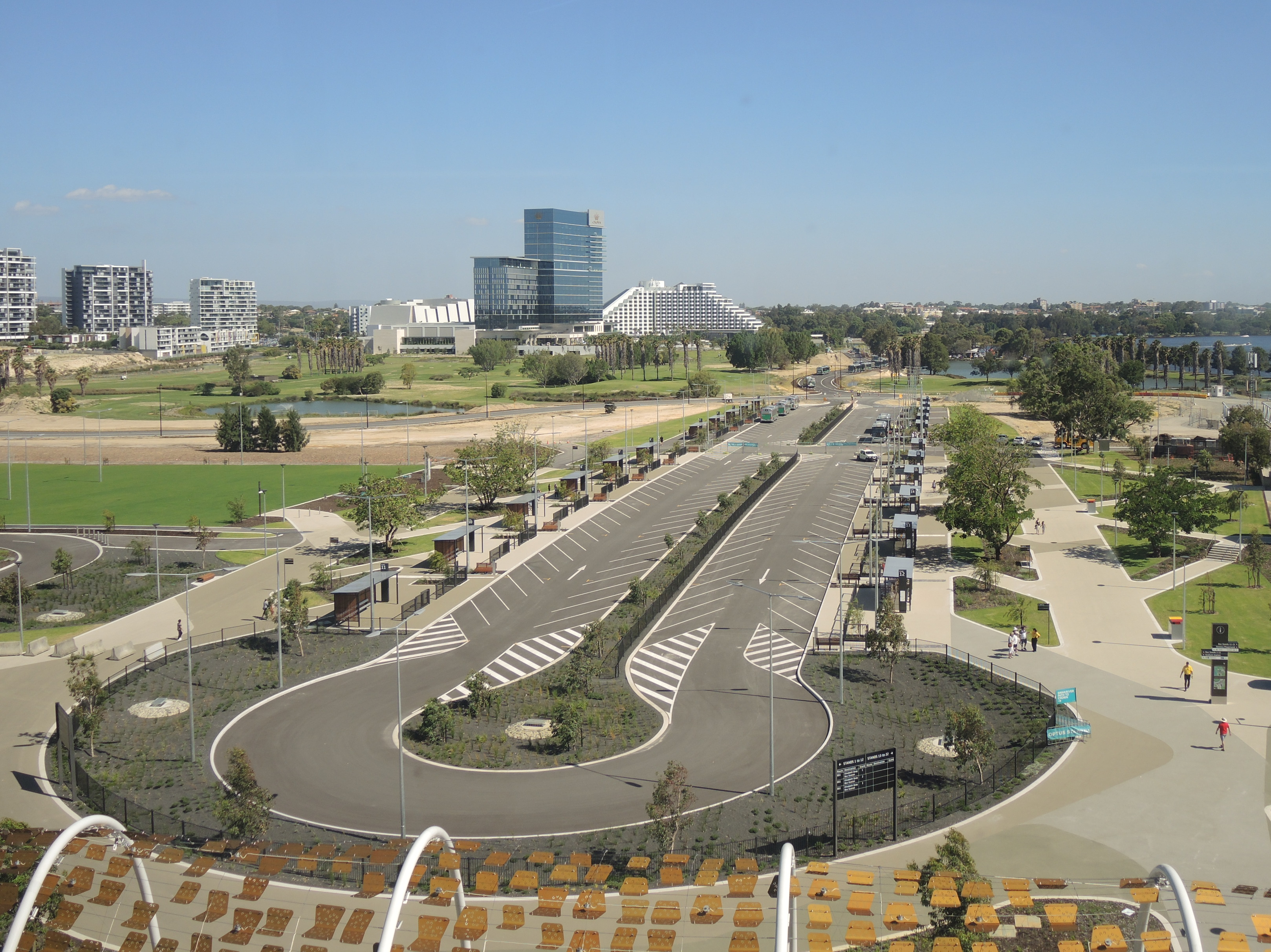
Perth Stadium Bus Station, consisting of 22 stands and currently serviced by nine Transperth bus routes

As the stadium is located on a peninsula with limited road access, the majority of visitors have to travel to and from the stadium primarily by public transport. The Public Transport Authority aims to have 83 percent of visitors use public transport. The six-platform Perth Stadium railway station and 22-stand Perth Stadium Bus Station located nearby are expected to serve an estimated 28,000 and 8,000 passengers respectively on event days.

For events, 8,600 people typically walk and cycle across the Swan River via the Windan Bridge, and an additional 14,300 walk across the Matagarup Bridge which connects the stadium precinct with public transport and car parks in East Perth. There are 600 bicycle parking spots located around the stadium precinct. The stadium has 1,400 car parking bays, but they are reserved for staff, premium ticket holders and disability parking. A taxi rank is next to the stadium.

A 96-metre (315 ft) jetty was built near Matagarup Bridge and officially opened on 11 June 2018. The Burswood Jetty allows all public and commercial vessels to drop off or pick up patrons with a 15-minute time limit. The Little Ferry Co. operates a service which operates Wednesday to Sunday to the jetty, while Captain Cook Cruises operates cruise transfers to and from the jetty on event days.

== Stadium uses ==
=== Australian rules football ===
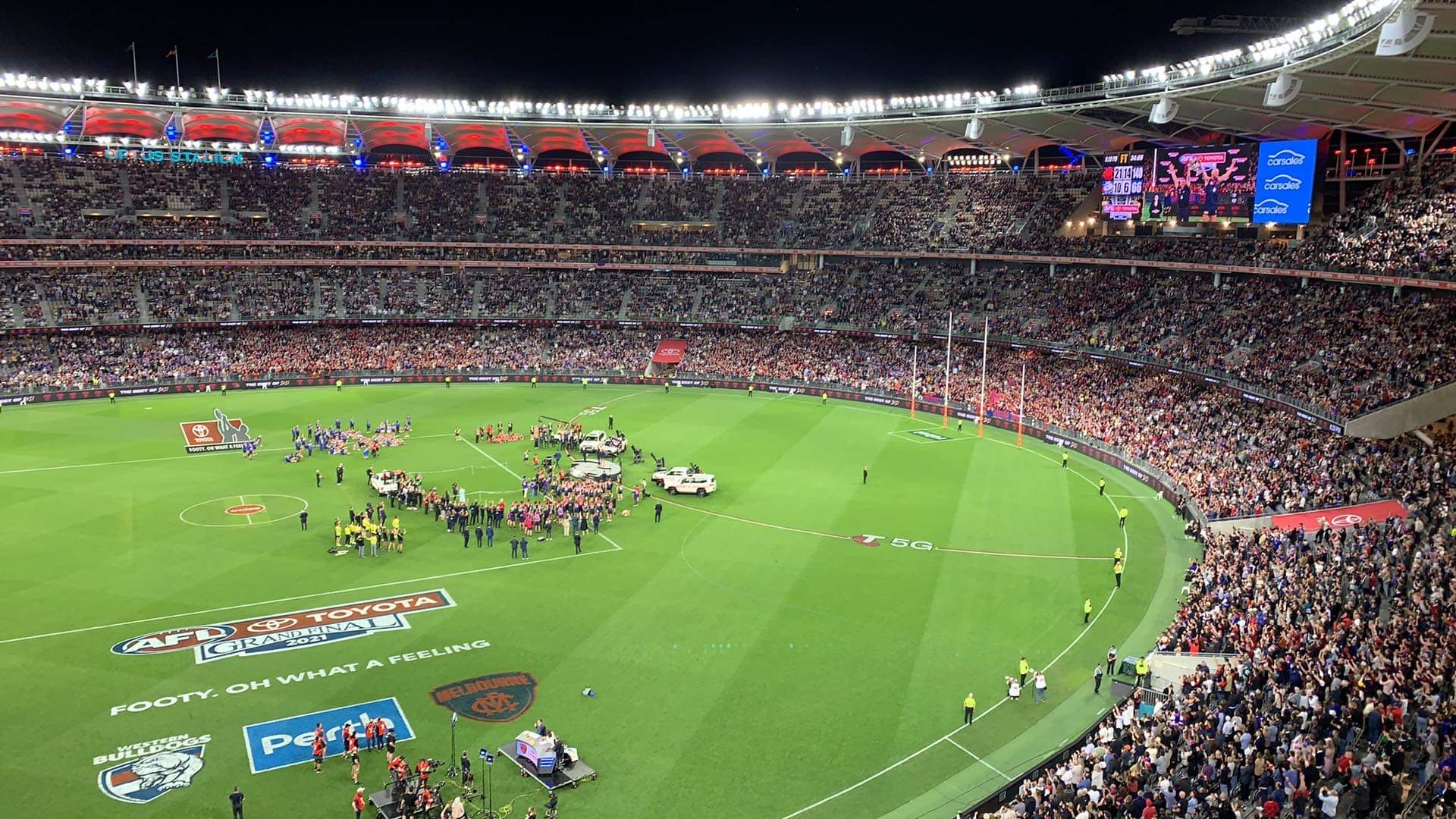
Perth Stadium hosted the 2021 AFL Grand Final.

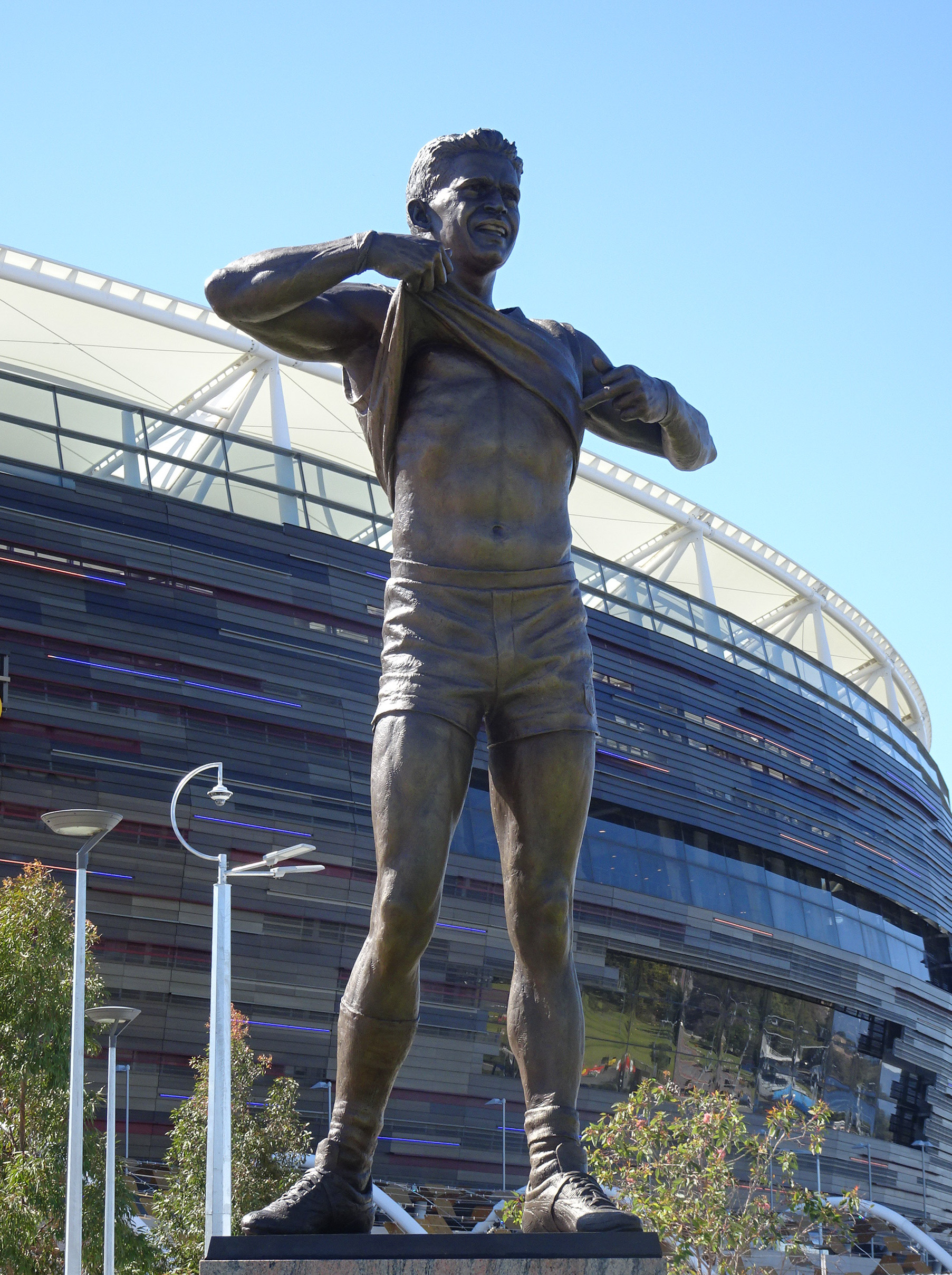
Nicky Winmar statue, erected 2019; removed 2026

Perth Stadium is used for Australian rules football matches in the Australian Football League (AFL) from March–September. The stadium was constructed to provide a new home ground for the West Coast Eagles and Fremantle Dockers, Perth's two professional AFL clubs. The state government negotiated an agreement with the AFL and the West Australian Football Commission (WAFC) in October 2017, allowing the Eagles and Dockers to play their home matches at the venue from the start of the 2018 season, in exchange for a minimum $10.3 million a year guarantee for the WAFC until 2028 although by 2023 this had risen to over $13 million per annum and projected to grow to over $15 million per annum by 2028 according to the 2025/2026 State budget.

Fremantle's women's team hosted the first Australian rules football match at the venue against Collingwood on 10 February 2018, and the attendance of 41,975 was the highest stand-alone figure in domestic women's sport. The first AFL premiership match to be played at the new stadium was contested between West Coast and Sydney on 25 March 2018.

Perth Stadium became the twelfth venue to host a Grand Final in VFL/AFL history, when, due to the COVID-19 lockdown in Victoria precluding travel from the state, it hosted the 2021 AFL Grand Final. The match saw the Melbourne Demons defeat the Western Bulldogs by 74 points to win their first AFL premiership since 1964. A total of 61,118 people attended, which at the time was the second highest crowd for the stadium and the biggest for an AFL game at the venue.

An AFL State of Origin game played at the stadium on 14 February 2026 between Western Australia and Victoria, the first State of Origin since 2020 and the first match up between the two states since 1992, drew 58,141 spectators.

=== Cricket ===
Cricket matches, such as One Day Internationals (ODI) and Twenty20s, are held at the stadium in the months of October–February. Since late 2017, the Australia national cricket team play most of their Perth-based Tests, One Day and Twenty20 matches at the venue. The stadium is also the home ground of Big Bash League side Perth Scorchers, who relocated from the WACA Ground in 2018. The first major event at the stadium was an ODI match between Australia and England on 28 January 2018, which England won by 12 runs.

Perth Stadium became the 19th venue in Australia to host a One Day International cricket game. The Western Australian Cricket Association later confirmed that the stadium would host its first ever Test match, which began between Australia and India on 14 December 2018.

Perth Stadium became the fourth venue in Australia to host a men's Day/night cricket Test match, when Australia took on New Zealand between 12 and 16 December 2019.

During the 2022 Men's T20 World Cup, Perth Stadium hosted five out of the 45 matches that were played around the country in October 2022.

In October 2024, it was announced that Perth Stadium will host the first test of the 2025–2026 Men's Ashes; this was the first time Perth Stadium hosted an Ashes Test.

The most runs scored here in Test format is by Marnus Labuschagne (524 runs), followed by Travis Head (391 runs) and Steve Smith (371 runs). The most wickets taken here is by Nathan Lyon (29 wickets), Mitchell Starc (26 wickets) and Josh Hazlewood (16 wickets).

The most runs scored here in ODI format is by Marcus Stoinis (109 runs), followed by Joe Root (62 runs) and Jason Roy (49 runs). The most wickets taken here is by Tom Curran (5 wickets) and Andrew Tye (5 wickets).

The stadium's cricket crowd record of 55,018 spectators was set during the 2025–26 Big Bash League Final between the Sydney Sixers and Perth Scorchers on 25 January 2026.

=== Rugby league ===
The National Rugby League played a double-header in round 1 of the 2018 NRL season in front of 38,842.

The second match of the 2019 State of Origin series between New South Wales and Queensland was played at Perth Stadium on 23 June 2019 and marked the first Origin game to be played in Western Australia. New South Wales defeated Queensland 38–6 in front of a crowd of 59,721.

On 21 April 2021, it was announced that the second match of the 2022 State of Origin series was to be held at Perth Stadium after managing to secure the event from the Australian Rugby League Commission for an undisclosed sum. New South Wales defeated Queensland 44–12 in front of a crowd of 59,358.

On 5 August 2023, the National Rugby League played a double-header in round 23 of the 2023 NRL season. The first game was between the Dolphins (NRL) versus the Newcastle Knights which ended in Newcastle winning 28 – 30. The second game was played between the South Sydney Rabbitohs and the Cronulla-Sutherland Sharks which resulted in Cronulla winning 16 – 26. The overall attendance that day was a total of 45,814.

In August 2023, it was announced that Perth Stadium had secured the right to host State of Origin games in 2025 and 2028. Queensland defeated New South Wales 26–24 in front of a crowd of 57,023 in the 2025 game.

=== Rugby union ===
The stadium hosted the Australian leg of the 2019 Bledisloe Cup series, which doubled as a Rugby Championship match, in which the Wallabies beat New Zealand 47–26 on 10 August 2019 in front of 61,241. The match was the first Bledisloe Cup Test to be held in Western Australia (the Subiaco Oval had previously hosted Mandela Challenge Plate tests in the Tri-Nations against South Africa) and set the stadium's highest single-day attendance record.

On 30 January 2020, the Western Australian state government announced that the Springboks would play the Wallabies at the stadium as part of the 2020 Rugby Championship on 29 August 2020. This was, however, cancelled due to the COVID-19 pandemic. However, in 2024, it was announced that the Springboks would take on the Wallabies at the stadium on 17 August that year, marking the former team's first return to Perth since 2017.

Following the success of the match in 2019, it was announced that the Australian leg of the Bledisloe Cup would return to the stadium in 2021. In September 2021 52,724 watched All Blacks beat the Wallabies 21–38.

In July 2022, the Wallabies hosted historic rivals England in a three-test series; the first match was played at Perth Stadium. Australia beat England 30–28 in front of 47,668. In August 2024 the Springboks beat Australia 12–30 in their Rugby Championship matchup in front of 58,197.

In June 2025 the stadium hosted a crowd of 46,656 for British and Irish Lions 56–7 tour match victory over the Western Force.

Perth Stadium will host the opening match of the 2027 Rugby World Cup.

=== Soccer ===
The stadium hosted a friendly match between Perth Glory and Chelsea on 23 July 2018.

The 2019 A-League Grand Final was played at the stadium on 19 May 2019, which was the first time Perth Glory has hosted the grand final in the League's history. The Grand Final broke the attendance record for an A-League finals series match, with 56,371 spectators. Manchester United played two pre-season games at the stadium, one against Perth Glory on 13 July 2019 and the other against historic rival Leeds United on 17 July 2019.

In July 2022, English Premier League clubs Manchester United, Aston Villa, Leeds United, and Crystal Palace travelled to Perth to compete in ICON – Perth's Festival of International Football. Crystal Palace played Leeds United on 22 July, and Manchester United played Aston Villa on 23 July.

On 18 July 2023, Premier League clubs Tottenham Hotspur and West Ham United played a friendly pre-season game at Perth Stadium. Earlier, the latter club had played Perth Glory on 15 July.

On 29 October 2023, Perth Stadium hosted a 2024 AFC Women's Olympic Qualifying Tournament match between the Matildas and the Philippines. The crowd of 59,155 was the largest attendance for a soccer match (men or women) at the stadium, and was the largest home crowd recorded for an Australian women's sports event outside of an Olympic Games or a World Cup. The stadium also hosted a qualifying match between Chinese Taipei and Iran on the same date.

On 31 May 2024, Italian clubs AC Milan and AS Roma played a friendly game at the stadium. The friendly was the two clubs' only game played in the Asia-Pacific region in 2024 and marked the return to Australia of AC Milan for the first time in 30 years and was AS Roma's first time in Perth since 1966.

On 5 June 2025, the stadium hosted a 2026 FIFA World Cup qualifier against Japan, which was the Socceroos' penultimate game in this qualifying round, and crucial in securing direct qualification to the tournament. Australia won the game 1–0 thanks to a 90th minute winner from Aziz Behich. This left the Socceroos only needing to avoid defeat by fewer than 5 goals against Saudi Arabia to qualify directly to the World Cup, on the final match day.

A regular season Serie A game between AC Milan and Como 1907 was slated to be held at the stadium on 8 February 2026, due to scheduling constraints with stadium San Siro hosting the 2026 Winter Olympics opening ceremony around the same time; however the match was cancelled in December 2025 due to "unacceptable conditions" imposed by the Asian Football Confederation. If it had proceeded, it would have been the first major European league regular season game to be played overseas.

On 1 March 2026, the 2026 AFC Women's Asian Cup opening ceremony and first group stage match between The Matildas and Philippines was held at the stadium, drawing 44,379 spectators. The stadium also hosted a semi-final match between The Matildas and China PR on 17 March 2026, drawing 35,170 spectators.

=== Entertainment ===
Perth Stadium is also capable of hosting major concerts and other entertainment events. Both Ed Sheeran and Taylor Swift performed at the venue in 2018. Nitro Circus performed at the stadium on 22 April 2018. Eminem performed at the stadium on 27 February 2019. U2 performed at the Stadium on 27 November 2019 as part of their 2019 Joshua Tree tour. Queen + Adam Lambert performed at the Stadium on 23 February 2020 as part of their Rhapsody Tour. On 18 November 2022, Guns N' Roses performed at the stadium as part of their 2022 tour. On 12 February 2023, the Red Hot Chili Peppers and Post Malone performed at the stadium as part of the former act's Global Stadium Tour. In the current biggest ticketed single-event at the stadium, Ed Sheeran performed again on 12 March 2023 as part of his +–=÷x Tour. The YouTube channel How Ridiculous uploaded a video on 8 March 2023 that had been filmed at the stadium. On 18 and 19 November 2023, as part of their Music of the Spheres World Tour, Coldplay performed their only 2023 Australian shows at the stadium; it was the band's first shows in Perth since their Viva la Vida Tour in February 2009. On 1 and 2 March 2024, Pink performed at the stadium as part of her Summer Carnival tour.

=== Professional wrestling ===
On 21 September 2023, WWE announced that the 2024 Elimination Chamber would be held at Perth Stadium on 24 February 2024. 52,590 spectators attended the event, which was the first WWE event held in Australia since 2018, and the only WWE event to be held in the Asia–Pacific region in 2024.

== Attendances ==
=== Sports ===
Top 10 all time sports attendances at Perth Stadium
No.	Attendance	Date	Game	Sport	Series
1	61,266	4 October 2025	All Blacks def. Wallabies	Rugby union	2025 Rugby Championship
2	61,241 (Note: Stadium was in rectangular mode with additional seating added.)	10 August 2019	Wallabies def. All Blacks	Rugby union	2019 Bledisloe Cup
3	61,118	25 September 2021	Melbourne def. Western Bulldogs	Australian rules football	2021 AFL Grand Final
4	59,725	11 September 2026	Fremantle def. Geelong	Australian rules football	2026 AFL finals series
5	59,721	23 June 2019	New South Wales def. Queensland	Rugby league	2019 State of Origin series
6	59,608	22 September 2018	West Coast def. Melbourne	Australian rules football	2018 AFL finals series
7	59,585	8 September 2018	West Coast def. Collingwood	Australian rules football	2018 AFL finals series
8	59,446	3 September 2026	Hawthorn def. Fremantle	Australian rules football	2026 AFL finals series
9	59,358	26 June 2022	New South Wales def. Queensland	Rugby league	2022 State of Origin series
10	59,216	5 September 2019	West Coast def. Essendon	Australian rules football	2019 AFL finals series

=== Other events ===
Top 10 musical acts/entertainment events attendances at Perth Stadium
No.	Attendance	Date	Participants	Event	Series/Tour	Ref.
1	124,883 (Note: Over two shows)	18 & 19 November 2023	Coldplay	Concert	Music of the Spheres World Tour	
2	114,031	2 & 3 March 2018	Ed Sheeran	Concert	÷ Tour	
3	110,000 (Note: Spread throughout the day. Time limited, hourly segments, no seating allocation)	21 January 2018	General public	Official opening and public open day	N/A	
4	73,092	12 March 2023	Ed Sheeran	Concert	+–=÷× Tour	
5	60,500	27 February 2019	Eminem	Concert	Rapture Tour (2019)	
6	55,800	1 November 2025	Metallica	Concert	M72 World Tour	
7	52,590	24 February 2024	WWE	Elimination Chamber: Perth	WWE Elimination Chamber	
8	51,180	12 February 2023	Red Hot Chili Peppers	Concert	Global Stadium Tour	
9	50,891	19 October 2018	Taylor Swift	Concert	Reputation Stadium Tour	
10	46,441	27 November 2019	U2	Concert	The Joshua Tree Tour 2019	

=== Overall single-day attendance records ===
No.	Attendance	Date	Event	Series/Tour
1	110,000	21 January 2018	Official opening and public open day	N/A
2	73,092	12 March 2023	Ed Sheeran Concert	+–=÷× Tour
3	61,241	10 August 2019	Wallabies def. All Blacks	2019 Bledisloe Cup
4	61,118	25 September 2021	Melbourne def. Western Bulldogs	2021 AFL Grand Final
5	60,500	27 February 2019	Eminem Concert	Rapture Tour (2019)
6	59,725	11 September 2026	Fremantle def. Geelong	2026 AFL finals series
7	59,721	23 June 2019	New South Wales def. Queensland	2019 State of Origin series
8	59,608	22 September 2018	West Coast def. Melbourne	2018 AFL finals series
9	59,588	8 September 2018	West Coast def. Collingwood	2018 AFL finals series
10	59,446	3 September 2026	Hawthorn def. Fremantle	2026 AFL finals series

== See also ==
- List of A-League stadiums
- List of Australian Football League grounds
- List of cricket grounds by capacity
- Lists of stadiums
