= Western Australian Athletics Stadium =

Stadium in Perth, Western Australia

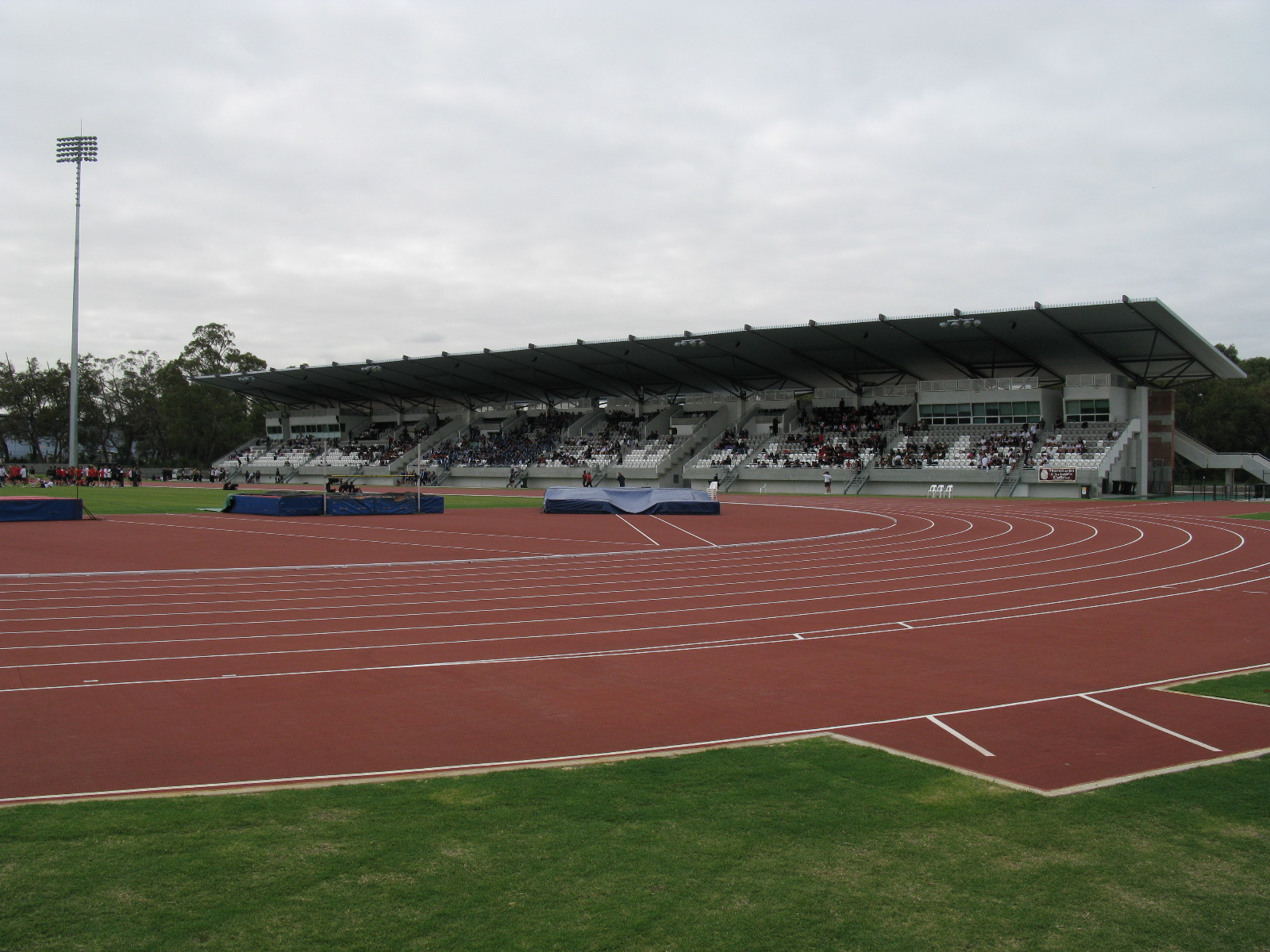
- Interactive map of Western Australian Athletics Stadium
- Location: Floreat, Perth, Western Australia
- Coordinates: 31°57′01″S 115°46′55″E
- Owner: Western Australian Government
- Operator: VenuesWest
- Capacity: 1,971 (grandstand); 8,000 (grass embankments)
- Surface: Mondo track / grass infield

Construction
- Opened: 2009
- Cost: A$73.4 million (2009)
- Architect: Various

Tenants
- Athletics Western Australia; Western Australian Institute of Sport; Subiaco AFC

The Western Australian Athletics Stadium is a sports stadium in Perth, Western Australia. It is the main facility for the sport of athletics in Perth. It was constructed to replace the ageing Perry Lakes Stadium nearby, which had been in use since the 1962 British Empire and Commonwealth Games. The stadium houses the head offices of Athletics Western Australia and is a major facility for athletes with the Western Australian Institute of Sport. The stadium is also used for soccer, with Subiaco AFC playing home games at the stadium from 2014.

== Opening ==
The opening ceremony was conducted on 26 May 2009, by the Premier of Western Australia, Colin Barnett, and included ceremonial activities to acknowledge the Aboriginal traditional owners as well as an inaugural 100m sprint event.

== Facilities ==
The stadium incorporates features which honour some of Western Australia's past sporting heroes. These include the Shirley Strickland Grandstand, the Herb Elliott Forecourt and the Wally Foreman Walk.

In regard to track events, the stadium provides a nine-lane 400-metre track and two 12-lane 110-metre sprint straights. For field events, there are five jumps pits, four pole vault runways, four shot put circles, two hammer and discus cages and two high jump and javelin sites. The infield provides for soccer and rugby to be played.

== Usage ==
Besides sporting events, the stadium can be configured to hold major concerts. Stevie Nicks performed the inaugural concert on 26 November 2011. Only one concert has been held at the venue. A Lenny Kravitz concert scheduled for 28 March 2012 was cancelled and an "80's Dance Picnic Party" featuring Ali Campbell and Billy Ocean scheduled for 21 January 2012 relocated to the neighbouring Challenge Stadium.
