= VenuesWest =

Venue management authority

Statutory Authority overview
- Formed: 1986
- Jurisdiction: Perth, Western Australia
- Headquarters: Mount Claremont
- Employees: 287 (2025)
- Minister responsible: Rita Saffioti, Minister for Sport & Recreation
- Statutory Authority executives: Mary Stephens, Chair; David Etherton, Chief Executive Officer
- Key document: Western Australian Sports Centre Trust Act 1986
- Website: www.venueswest.wa.gov.au

VenuesWest, formerly the Western Australian Sports Centre Trust, is a statutory authority of the Government of Western Australia. It is responsible for managing 14 sport and entertainment venues in Perth, Western Australia.

== History ==
The Western Australian Sports Centre Trust was formed pursuant to the Western Australian Sports Centre Trust Act 1986. It was formed to manage the Perth Superdrome that opened in the same year.

In May 2009, Western Australian Sports Centre Trust was renamed VenuesWest.

In September 2025, the Sports and Entertainment Trust Bill 2025 was introduced by the Cook government to the Parliament of Western Australia to succeed the Western Australian Sports Centre Trust Act 1986, as that bill was designed to support the running of just Perth High Performance Centre, not the organisation at the scale it has grown to.

== Venue management models ==
Venueswest operates four different venue management models that are used to run the venues.

Type	Description	Examples
VenuesWest Managed	This model is suitable where VenuesWest has the knowledge, experience and capacity to manage venue operations and directly support high performance sport. This model regularly partners with the private sector to deliver services.	Arena Joondalup; Champion Lakes Regatta Centre; Perth Arena; Perth High Performance Centre; Perth Rectangular Stadium; Perth SpeedDome; Western Australian Athletics Stadium
Partner Managed	This model is suitable for use in venues hosting a variety of different events involving multiple hirers. VenuesWest engages an external party through an open tender process to manage the venue operations.	Perth Stadium, operated by VenuesLive
Co-managed	This model is suitable for use in venues where there is a primary tenant responsible for the majority of usage. This model provides the tenant with priority of use.	Gold Netball Centre, co-managed with Netball Western Australia; Sam Kerr Football Centre, co-managed with Football West; WA Basketball Centre, co-managed with Basketball WA
Lease Agreement	This model is suitable for use in single purpose venues with a sole tenant. A lease is provided to the tenant in line with the objectives for that venue.	Perth Motorplex; WA Institute of Sport High Performance Service Centre; WA Rugby Centre, leased to RugbyWA
