= WAIS Warriors =

- Leagues: State Basketball League
- Founded: 1989
- Dissolved: 1991
- History: WAIS Warriors; 1989–1991
- Arena: Superdrome (1989); University of Western Australia (1990–1991)
- Location: Perth, Western Australia
- Team colors: Green, gold, black, white
- Championships: 0

The WAIS Warriors were an Australian basketball team based in Perth, Western Australia. As part of the Western Australian Institute of Sport (WAIS), the Warriors competed in the Men's State Basketball League (SBL) and played their home games at the Superdrome and the University of Western Australia (UWA).

== Team history ==
=== Background ===
In 1987, the Western Australian Institute of Sport collaborated with the Western Australian Basketball Federation to establish a men's basketball team. Led by director Wally Foreman and head coach Warren Kuhn, the team entered the A division of the State League in 1987 and was based at the Superdrome in Graylands. In 1988, the team adopted the name "WAIS Junior Wildcats".

The program aimed to assemble top young players together into a single team to accelerate their development through competition against senior teams. Kuhn established a reputation as an innovative basketball coach and strategist in Western Australia, with a recognised specialisation in developing post players.

=== SBL ===
1989 saw the formation of the State Basketball League (SBL). The WAIS men's team, now known as the Warriors, entered the SBL for its inaugural season. The Warriors competed in the first three seasons of the SBL, recording six wins in 1989, two in 1990, and going winless in 1991. Their home venue was the Superdrome in 1989, followed by the UWA Gymnasium in 1990 and 1991. The Warriors played in green, gold, black and white colours.

Former SBL games-record holder Troy Clarke played for the Warriors in 1990 and 1991. Clarke served as captain of the team in his second year.

The program was discontinued at the end of 1991.

== Season-by-season results ==
Year	Won	Lost	Pos	Titles
1989	6	16	9th	
1990	2	24	14th	Wooden spoon
1991	0	26	14th	Wooden spoon
