= Perth High Performance Centre =

Sports complex in Perth, Western Australia

- Perth HPC
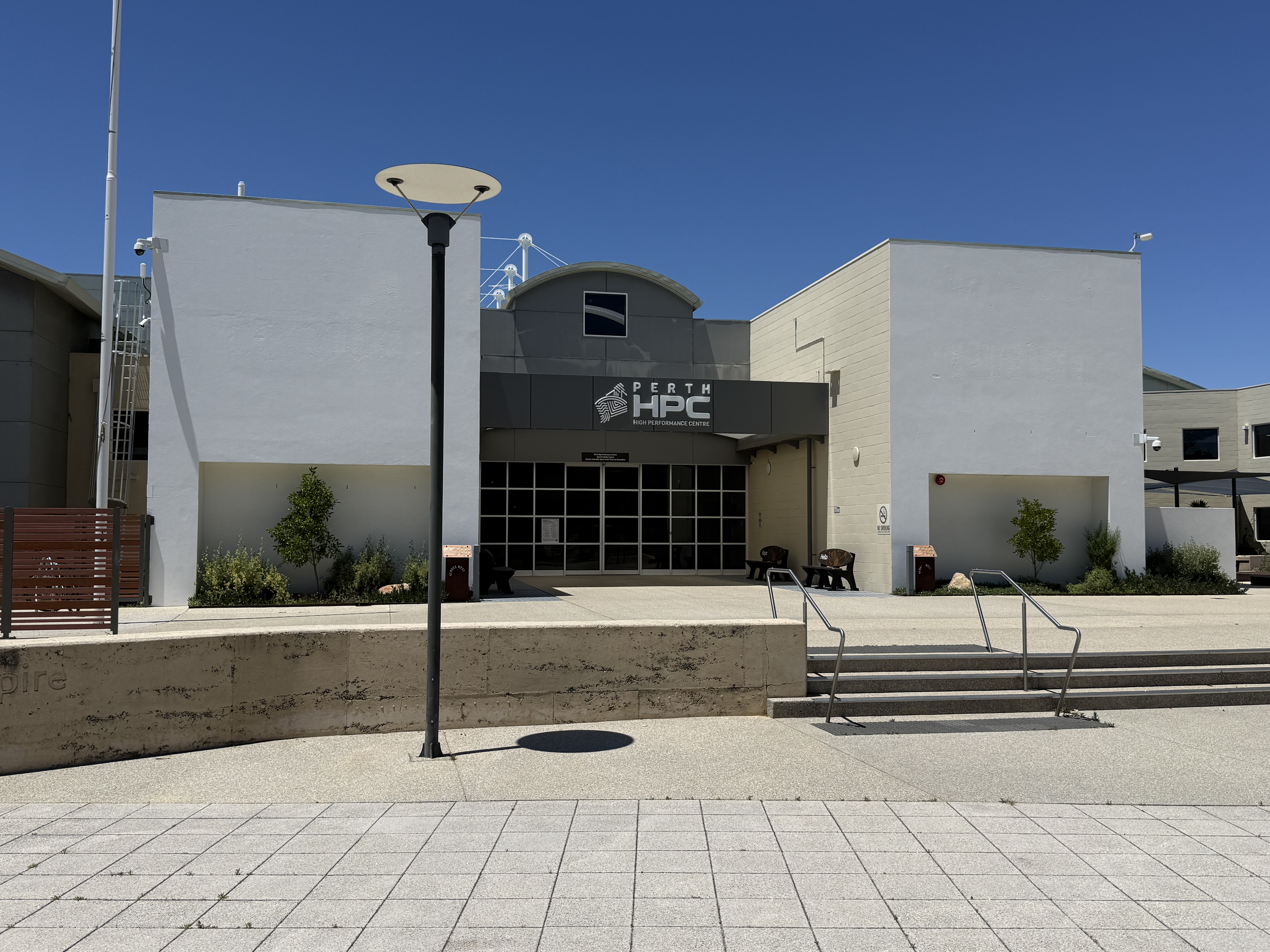
- Perth HPC main entrance
- Interactive map of Perth High Performance Centre
- Former names: Superdrome (1986–1996); Challenge Stadium (1996–2014); HBF Stadium (2014–2024)
- Location: Stephenson Avenue, Mount Claremont, Western Australia
- Coordinates: 31°57′09″S 115°46′57″E
- Operator: VenuesWest
- Capacity: Basketball / Netball: 4,500

Construction
- Opened: 1986; 40 years ago

Tenants
- Perth Wildcats (NBL) (1987–1989; 2002–2012); Perth Lynx (WNBL) (1988–1989; 2000–2001; 2024–); WAIS Warriors (SBL) (1989); Perth Orioles (CBT) (1997–2007); West Coast Fever (ANZ / NNL) (2008–2018)

Website
- www.perthhpc.com.au

Perth High Performance Centre (Perth HPC) is a sports complex in Perth, Western Australia. The venue is located in the suburb of Mount Claremont, approximately 8 kilometres (5.0 mi) west of the Perth central business district.

Venue facilities include an Olympic-standard aquatic centre with five pools, a diving tower, gymnasium, two arenas, and several basketball courts, as well as a café, childcare centre, sports store, office accommodation and a museum. The main indoor arena has seating for 4,500 spectators. Regular exhibitions and expos are hosted at the venue, as well as national and international sporting events and concerts.

The venue was opened in 1986 as the Superdrome, and was later known as Challenge Stadium and HBF Stadium, until being rebranded on 1 January 2025 as the Perth High Performance Centre.

== Venue name ==
The Superdrome was built in 1986. In 1996, the Superdrome became known as Challenge Stadium courtesy of a naming rights deal between the WA Government and Challenge Bank. The bank paid $250,000 a year for naming rights to the venue until 2002 when it decided not to renew the contract after changing its name to Westpac. Although the sponsorship with Challenge Bank expired in 2002, the Challenge Stadium name remained in use until 2014. Under a commercial naming rights arrangement with the HBF Health Fund, the venue became known as HBF Stadium from 1 July 2014.

On 1 October 2024, it was announced that on 1 January 2025, HBF Stadium would be rebranded as the Perth High Performance Centre.

== As a sports venue ==
=== Main indoor arena ===
==== Basketball ====
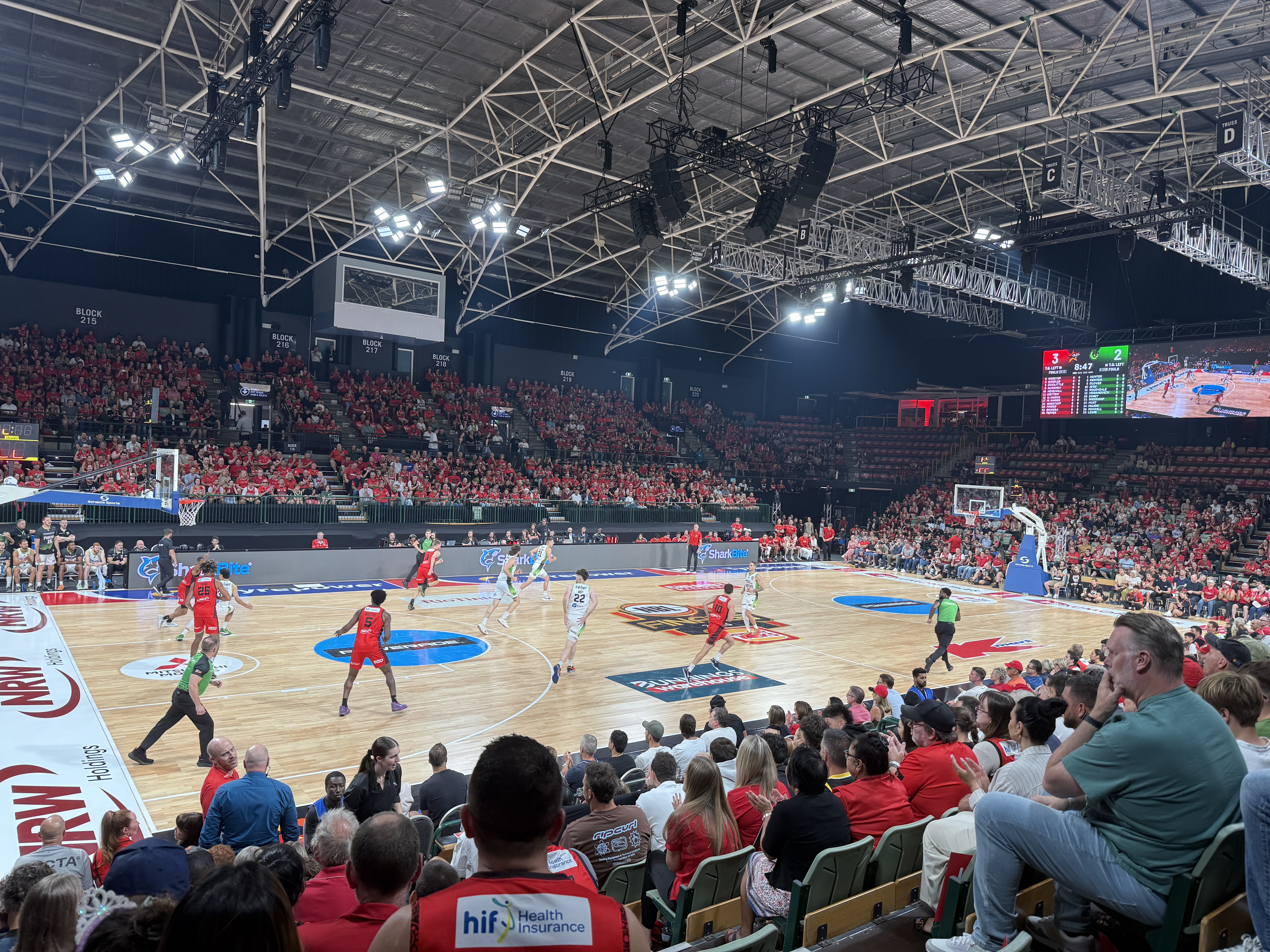
Main indoor arena, NBL game Perth Wildcats vs South East Melbourne Phoenix, 11 February 2025

Perth High Performance Centre has twice been the home venue of the Perth Wildcats of the National Basketball League (NBL). The Wildcats first played at the venue between 1987 and 1989 and then returned for a second stint between 2002 and 2012. Known as Challenge Stadium during their second stint, the venue regularly attracted sell-out crowds of around 4,400 fans and was dubbed "The Jungle" due to its intimidating atmosphere.

Perth High Performance Centre has also been the home venue of the Perth Lynx of the Women's National Basketball League (WNBL). The Lynx were based at the Superdrome in 1988 and 1989 as the Perth Breakers, and played at Challenge Stadium during the 2000–01 season. The WAIS Warriors of the State Basketball League (SBL) also played at the Superdrome in 1989.

In 2024, the WA Government invested $1.6 million in upgrades to bring Perth HPC up to Level 1 FIBA certification ahead of the NBL's HoopsFest and to host Perth Lynx games during the 2024–25 WNBL season. The Lynx went on to play three games at Perth HPC during the 2024–25 season.

On 11 February 2025, Perth High Performance Centre hosted the Wildcats' NBL Seeding Qualifier against the South East Melbourne Phoenix due to the unavailability of Perth Arena. It marked the Wildcats' first game at the venue since 2012.

Perth HPC became the permanent home of the Perth Lynx for the 2025–26 WNBL season.

==== Netball ====
Beginning in 2008, the venue served as the main home court for the West Coast Fever in the Super Netball league. To the Fever, the venue was known as "The Cauldron". The Fever moved all their home matches to Perth Arena from 2019 onwards. In February 2026, the Fever will play a pre-season match at the Perth High Performance Centre, marking a return to the venue for the first time since 2018.

=== Swimming ===
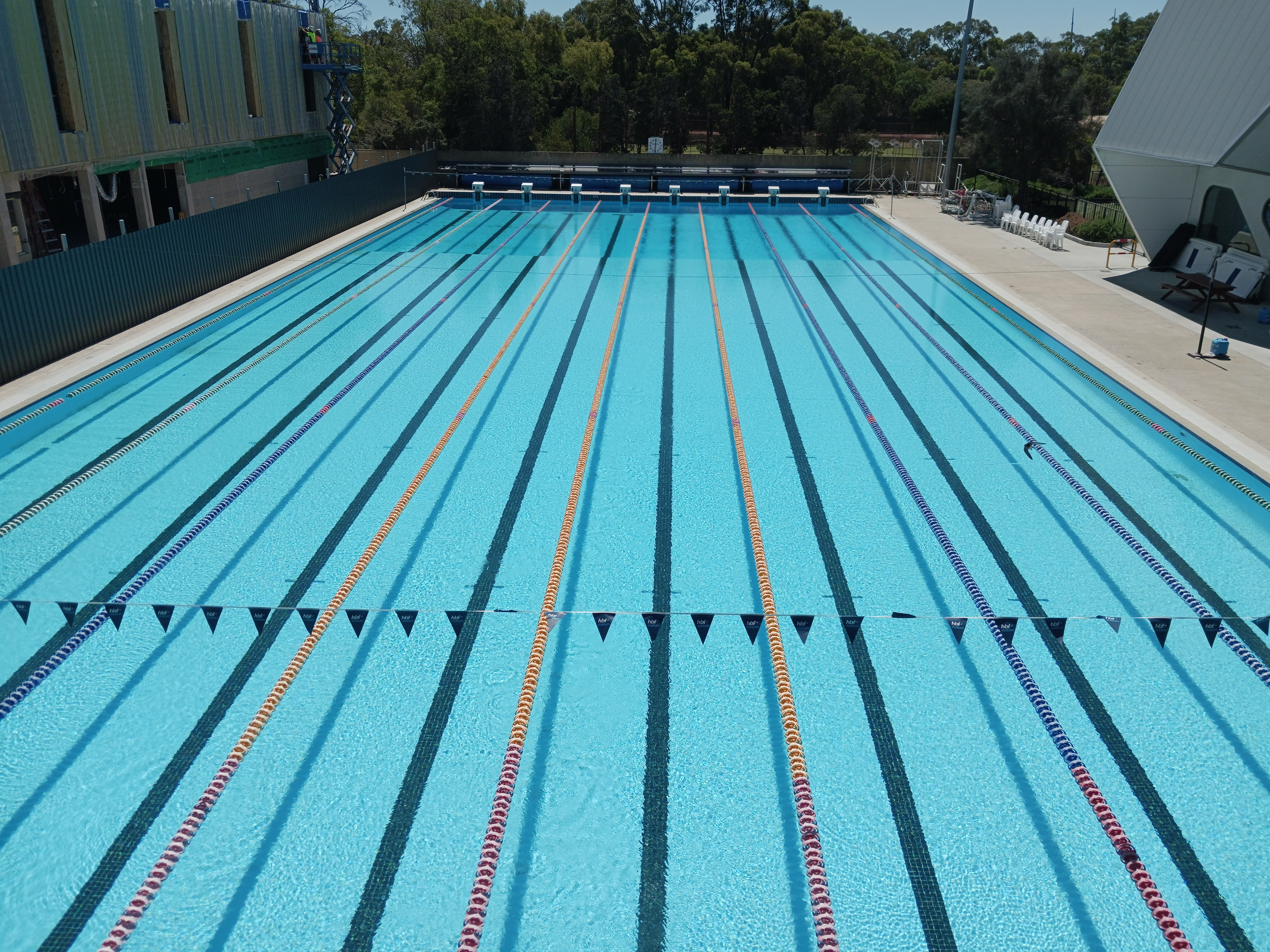
Outdoor swimming pool at Perth HPC

The aquatic centre hosted the FINA World Aquatics Championships in 1991 and 1998. It also hosted the Australian Swimming Championships long course in 1993 and 1995, as well as the short course in 1998, 2001 and 2012.

=== Diving ===
The venue is the home of Diving WA, the state sporting association for the sport of diving. In May 2023, the Bruce Prance Dryland Diving Centre was opened at the complex.

=== WAIS ===
The venue was home to the Western Australian Institute of Sport (WAIS) between 1996 and 2014. The institute was based in the annex on the southern side of Challenge Stadium until moving into the new WAIS High Performance Service Centre, which was built on the eastern side of Challenge Stadium. It comprises a strength and conditioning gym, multi-purpose training and testing area, 80-metre (260 ft) four lane indoor runway for long jump, sprinting and throwing sports, hydrotherapy and recovery pools, physiology and environmental laboratories, consultation rooms, athlete amenities and office space.

== As a music venue ==
The venue has hosted many concerts since its inception.

=== 2000s ===
2003

- Craig David – 4 November 2003
- Cold Chisel – 11 December 2003

2004

- P!nk – 30 April 2004

2005

- Avril Lavigne – 6 April 2005
- Simple Plan – 11 October 2005
- Kelly Clarkson – 4 November 2005

2006

- Status Quo & Deep Purple – 3 May 2006
- Wolfmother – 16 July 2006
- The Strokes – 9 August 2006
- INXS – 12 September 2006
- Westlife – 17 September 2006
- Rogue Traders – 5 October 2006
- Live – 24 October 2006
- G3 (Joe Satriani, Steve Vai, John Petrucci) – 8 December 2006

2007

- Evanescence – 15 February 2007
- Westlife – 21 February 2007
- P!nk – 18–20 April & 2–4 June 2007
- Human Nature – 22–23 June 2007
- Heaven & Hell & Down – 2 August 2007
- The Cure – 4 August 2007
- Fall Out Boy – 29 September 2007
- Marilyn Manson – 13 October 2007
- Motörhead – 16 October 2007
- Good Charlotte – 17 October 2007

2008

- Kelly Clarkson – 1 March 2008
- The Black Crowes – 26 March 2008
- James Blunt – 9 May 2008
- Michael Bublé – 11–12 & 14–15 June 2008
- Paul Weller – 13 August 2008
- Panic! at the Disco – 27 August 2008
- Disturbed – 29 August 2008
- Judas Priest – 16 September 2008

2009

- Fall Out Boy – 15 February 2009
- The Veronicas – 28 February & 1 March 2009
- The Living End – 22 May 2009
- Alice Cooper – 1 September 2009
- Chris Isaak – 16 & 17 September 2009
- Suzi Quatro – 22 September 2009
- Marilyn Manson – 5 October 2009
- Slayer & Megadeth – 13 October 2009
- Short Stack – 13 December 2009

=== 2010s ===
2010

- Them Crooked Vultures – 19 January 2010
- Backstreet Boys – 2 March 2010
- Status Quo – 17 March 2010
- Short Stack – 26 March 2010
- Kelly Clarkson – 22 April 2010
- Deep Purple – 5 May 2010
- Yusuf – 10 June 2010
- Thirty Seconds to Mars – 24 July 2010
- Mika Singh – 7 August 2010
- Florence and the Machine – 10 August 2010
- Bullet for My Valentine – 5 September 2010
- Parkway Drive – 3 October 2010
- Paramore – 10 October 2010
- Village People – 20 October 2010
- Creedence Clearwater Revisited – 13 October 2010
- Jason Derülo – 2 November 2010
- Pendulum – 6 November 2010

2011

- Kesha – 7 March 2011
- Stone Temple Pilots – 16 March 2011
- The Script – 2 April 2011
- Good Charlotte – 15 April 2011
- Cirque Du Soleil – 21 April to 8 May 2011
- Eason Chan – 20 May 2011
- Bliss N Eso – 21 May 2011
- Parkway Drive – 27 May 2011
- Rise Against – 23 July 2011
- Winterbeatz – 17 August 2011
- Alice Cooper – 2 October 2011
- The Wombats – 11 October 2011
- Steely Dan & Steve Winwood – 18 October 2011

2012

- Tim Minchin – 10 & 12 February 2012
- Roxette – 28 & 29 February 2012
- Flight of the Conchords – 18, 19 & 20 July 2012
- The Smashing Pumpkins – 26 July 2012
- Hilltop Hoods – 17 August 2012
- Kelly Clarkson – 5 October 2012
- Roch Voisine – 24 November 2012
- Parkway Drive – 19 December 2012

2013

- X Factor Live – 16 January 2013
- Ringo Starr & His All-Starr Band – 21 February 2013
- Ed Sheeran – 23 February 2013
- Flume – 13 May 2013
- Alt-J – 27 July 2013
- Bring Me the Horizon – 12 October 2013
- Eros Ramazzotti – 23 November 2013
- Simple Plan – 3 December 2013

2014

- Thirty Seconds to Mars – 25 March 2014
- Ellie Goulding – 28 May 2014
- Bastille – 18 June 2014
- Lorde – 5 July 2014
- Anna Vissi – 3 October 2014

2016

- The 1975 – 23 January 2016
- Troye Sivan – 13 August 2016
- Bring Me the Horizon – 14 September 2016

2017

- Charles Aznavour – 1 October 2017
- J.Cole – 9 December 2017

2018

- Live – 6 January 2018
- Halsey – 24 April 2018
- 5 Seconds of Summer – 18 August 2018
