= Perth Arena =

Sports and entertainment venue in Perth, Western Australia

Perth Arena RAC Arena

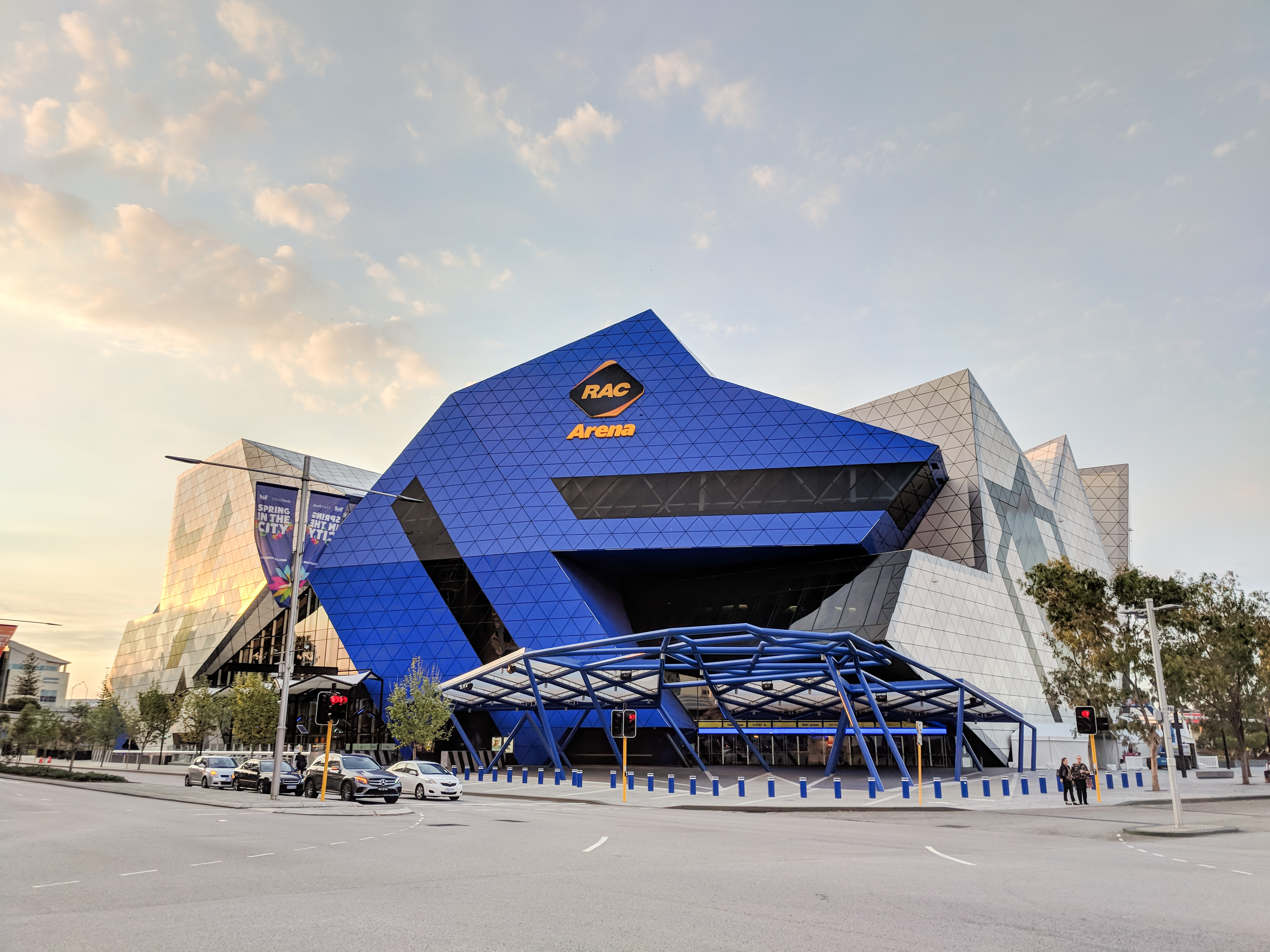
- Interactive map of Perth Arena; RAC Arena
- Former names: Perth Arena (2012–2018)
- Address: 700 Wellington Street, Perth
- Location: Western Australia
- Coordinates: 31°56′54″S 115°51′07″E
- Owner: VenuesWest
- Operator: VenuesWest
- Capacity: 15,500

Construction
- Groundbreaking: June 2007
- Opened: 10 November 2012
- Cost: A$548.7 million
- Architects: ARM & CCN
- Builder: WSP
- Project manager: Appian Group
- Structural engineer: Aurecon
- Services engineers: Wood & Grieve Engineers
- General contractor: BGC
- Main contractor: Buss Construction

Tenants
- Perth Wildcats (NBL) (2012–present); West Coast Fever (ANZ Championship/SSN) (2013–present); Hopman Cup (2013–2019); Major sporting events hosted; 2020 ATP Cup United Cup (2023–present)

Website
- racarena.com.au

Perth Arena (known commercially as RAC Arena) is an entertainment and sporting arena in the city centre of Perth, Western Australia, used mostly for basketball games. It is located on Wellington Street near the site of the former Perth Entertainment Centre, and was officially opened on 10 November 2012. Perth Arena was the first stage of the Perth City Link, a 13.5-hectare (33-acre) major urban renewal and redevelopment project which involved the sinking of the Eastern Railway to link the Perth central business district directly with Northbridge.

Anchor tenants of Perth Arena include the Perth Wildcats, West Coast Fever, and until 2019, the Hopman Cup.

== History ==
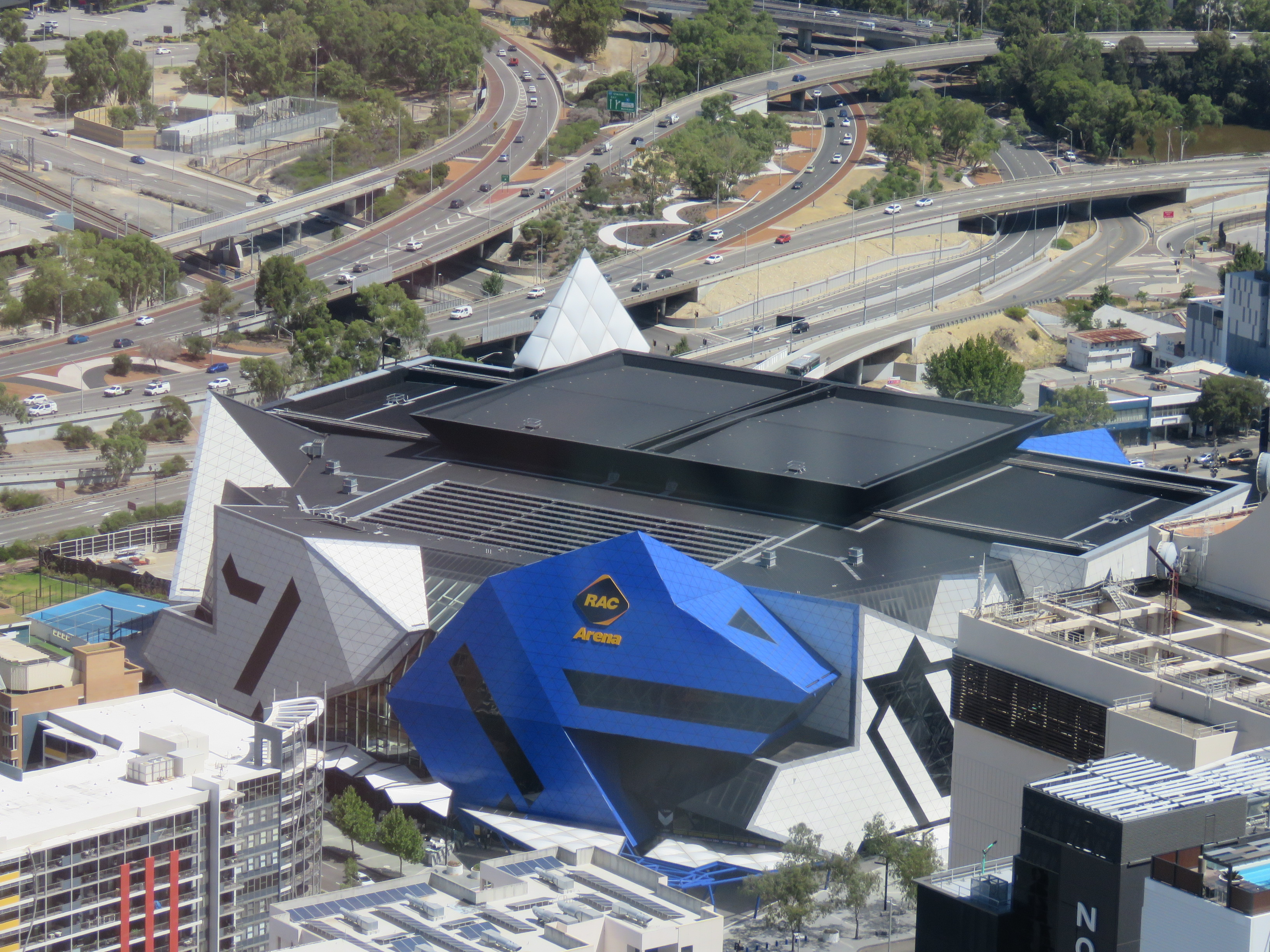
Perth Arena, as seen from the 50th floor of the Central Park building.

Perth Arena is owned and operated by VenuesWest (which also operates the Perth High Performance Centre, Arena Joondalup, WA Basketball Centre, and others) on behalf of the Government of Western Australia. Legends Global (formerly AEG Ogden) had initially managed the arena upon opening, with VenuesWest assuming management of the facility from July 2026.

The inaugural general manager of Perth Arena was David Humphreys, former general manager of the Perth Entertainment Centre and the Sydney SuperDome. Humphreys died two months before the venue's opening. AEG Ogden announced Steve Hevern as the interim general manager on 3 October 2012.

Elton John opened the arena with a concert on 10 November 2012. Part of the concert was also broadcast as the opening segment to the 2012 Channel Seven Perth Telethon.

=== Design and construction ===
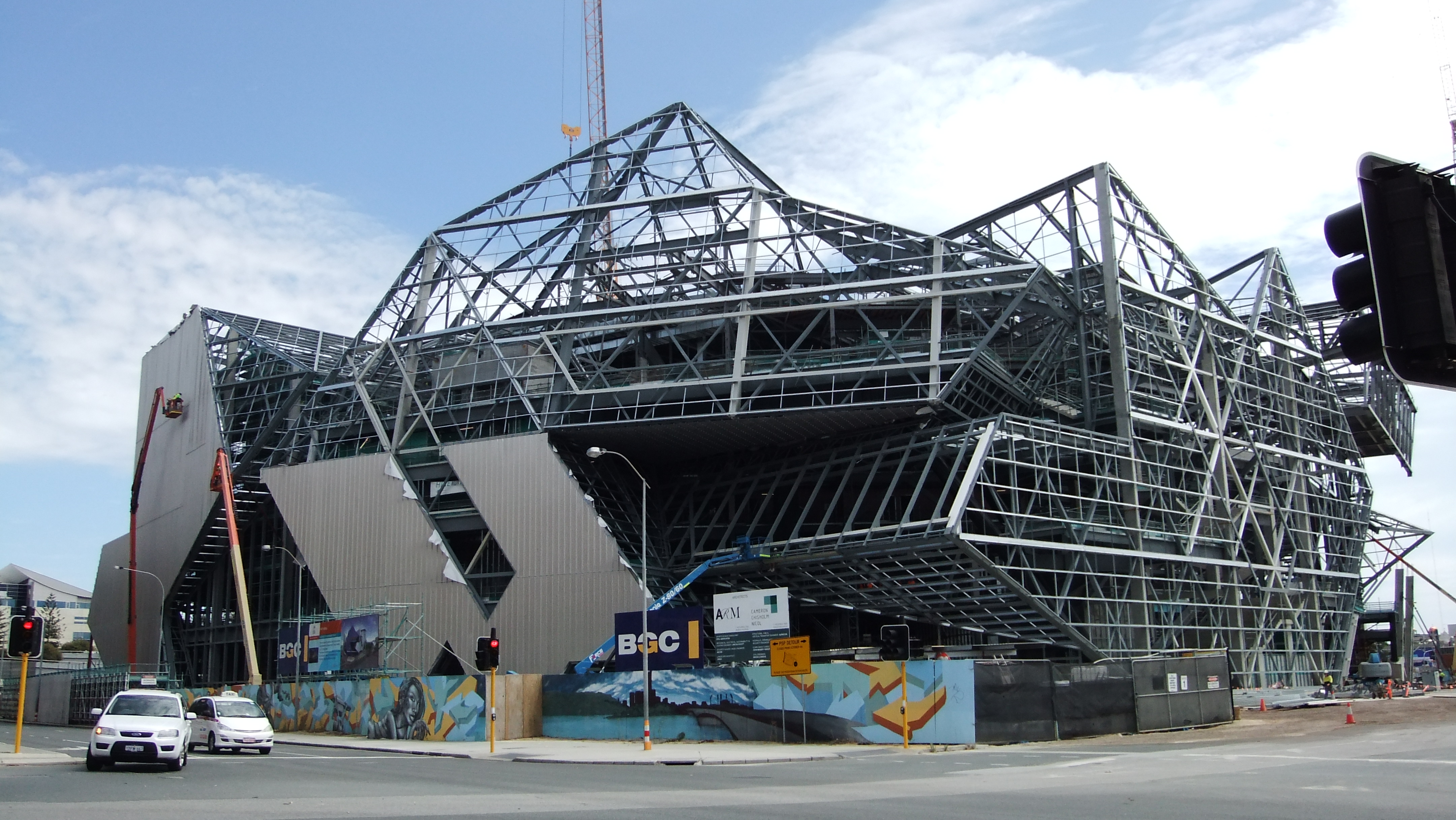
The arena under construction in February 2011, with underlying steel framework visible

The tender for the project was won by Western Australian construction consortium BGC, and work commenced on the site in June 2007. The arena was jointly designed by architectural firms Ashton Raggatt McDougall and Cameron Chisholm Nicol. With its design based on the Eternity puzzle, the venue holds up to 13,910 spectators for tennis events, 14,846 for basketball (the arena's capacity is capped at 13,000 for National Basketball League regular season games) and a maximum of 15,000 for music or rock concerts. The venue has a retractable roof, 36 luxury appointed corporate suites, a 680-bay underground car park, 5 dedicated function spaces, and touring trucks can drive directly onto the arena floor.

The construction was marred by controversy in relation to the cost and time blowouts from the original $150 million estimate to $550 million. Auditor General Colin Murphy reported in 2010 that "the initial estimates of the cost and opening date for the Arena were unrealistic and made before the project was well understood or defined." An example of the modifications to the original Arena design is the change of the carpark location from being built above the nearby railway line as a separate project to underneath the Arena itself.

=== Naming rights ===
For the first six years of operation, Perth Arena retained its non-commercial name. In September 2018, the venue name was changed to RAC Arena. The Royal Automobile Club of Western Australia (RAC) agreed to a five-year naming rights arrangement, with the deal estimated to be worth about $10 million to the Government of Western Australia. In November 2025, RAC renewed its naming rights partnership for the arena for another five years to 2030.

Prior to the name change in 2018, the Government of Western Australia had paid around $8 million to stadium operator AEG Ogden as compensation for not being able to sell the naming rights.

== Entertainment ==
Following his concert that opened the venue, Elton John and support act 2Cellos performed a follow up sold-out show at Perth Arena on 12 November 2012. John had replaced George Michael as the arena's first performer after Michael was forced to pull out due to health issues.

On 8 and 9 November 2013, the American musician Beyoncé played 2 sold-out shows there to conclude the Oceania leg of her world tour, The Mrs Carter Show World Tour.

On 20 August 2014, Lady Gaga performed at the arena for her artRAVE: The ARTPOP Ball.

On 29 October and 1 November 2014, The Rolling Stones played two sold out nights at the venue on their first visit to Perth since 1995.

On 14 March 2015, Australian singer Kylie Minogue performed at the arena as part of her Kiss Me Once Tour. On 15 February 2025, she returned for a stop on her Tension Tour.

On 4 August 2018, French Canadian singer Celine Dion performed at the arena for the first time, as a part of Celine Dion Live 2018. This was the first show by Dion, since her Taking Chances World Tour, to be held in Perth.

On 12 October 2018, American singer-actress Cher performed for the first time at the Arena as part of her Here We Go Again Tour.

In 2022, it was announced that Perth Arena would be the new host for the Channel Seven Perth Telethon.

On 29 and 30 September 2022, the American singer-songwriter Billie Eilish performed her final two dates in Australia during her tour, Happier Than Ever: The World Tour.

On 25 October 2023, Irish folk-rock band The Corrs performed at the arena as part of their 2023 tour of Australasia and Southeast Asia. The group was supported by Australian pop singer Natalie Imbruglia, as well as Toni Childs and Germein.

In September 2026, Radiohead announced they will be playing four shows at the arena in May 2027, their first Perth shows since 1998.

In October 2027, Nickelback will perform one show at the venue as part of their Everything Under the Sun Tour.

== Sports ==
=== Basketball ===
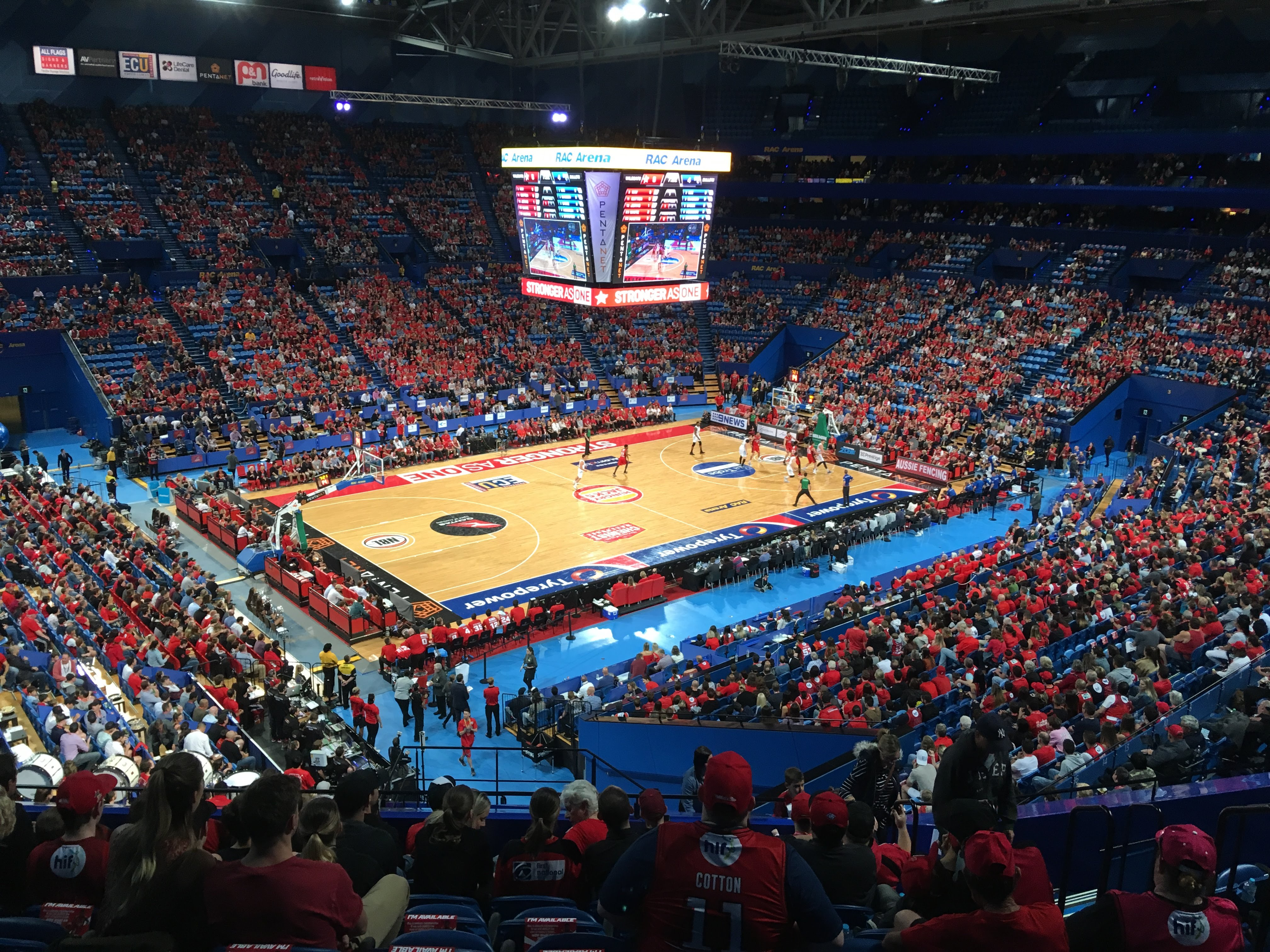
Perth Arena during a basketball match, 20 October 2018

Perth Arena hosted its first National Basketball League game on 16 November 2012 when the Perth Wildcats played (and lost) against the Adelaide 36ers in front of a crowd of 11,562. The attendance was the largest recorded in Western Australia for an indoor event, breaking the previous record of 8,501 set at the Burswood Dome in 2004. The arena has since hosted larger crowds, with the current record being 13,661 set in December 2025.

With a capacity of 14,846, Perth Arena is the second-largest venue currently in use in the NBL (2016–17) behind the Sydney SuperDome (18,200). The arena is also the third largest venue ever used in the NBL behind Sydney and the Rod Laver Arena in Melbourne (15,400).

In 2024, Perth Arena became the grand final host venue of the NBL1 West.

=== Tennis ===
On 2 January 2019, a record crowd of 14,064 attended the venue for the 2019 Hopman Cup match between United States and Switzerland. This was also the highest attendance for a tennis match in Western Australian history. The stadium hosted the Hopman Cup until the tournament switched to using different host countries after 2019. It was chosen by Tennis Australia to host the 2019 Fed Cup Final between Australia and France. In 2020 the arena was one of three Australian venues to host ties in the multi-nation ATP Cup tournament. Since 2022 it has been one of three venues to host the multi-nation mixed-team United Cup tournament.

=== Boxing ===
George Kambosos and Vasily Lomachenko fought for the vacant IBF lightweight title, and Kambosos' IBO title, at Perth Arena on 12 May 2024. Lomachenko was crowned the new unified champion by eleventh round technical knockout.

=== Mixed martial arts ===
The UFC hosted UFC 221: Romero vs. Rockhold at Perth Arena on February 11, 2018. The promotion returned to the arena five years later for UFC 284: Makhachev vs. Volkanovski on February 12, 2023. The UFC held UFC 305: du Plessis vs. Adesanya at Perth Arena on August 18, 2024. The arena hosted UFC Fight Night: Ulberg vs. Reyes on September 28, 2025. The arena hosted UFC Fight Night: Della Maddalena vs. Prates on May 2, 2026.

=== Netball ===
Netball was first played at the arena on 27 April 2013, when home team the West Coast Fever lost 49–58 to the Melbourne Vixens in the ANZ Championship. The Fever has continued to play occasional matches at the venue over the years, sharing fixtures with the smaller Perth High Performance Centre. Ahead of the 2018 season, the club shifted all home matches to Perth Arena. The crowd of 13,722 at the 2018 Super Netball Grand Final was a domestic-league record.

The first international netball test was played at Perth Arena on 30 October 2015 between Australia and New Zealand in the final test of the Constellation Cup.

=== Professional wrestling ===
American professional wrestling company WWE hosted their premium event Crown Jewel: Perth at the arena on 11 October 2025. The venue also hosted Friday Night SmackDown on 10 October 2025 and Monday Night Raw on 13 October 2025. Crown Jewel was attended by 13,683 spectators, with the combined attendance total for all three events announced to be 40,503.

In August 2026, it was announced that a new three-year deal with the WWE and the Government of Western Australia will see the arena host an annual "WWE Weekend Takeover", consisting of a premium live event alongside SmackDown and Raw tapings, through to 2028. The first premium live event as part of this deal, Wrestlepalooza: Perth, will take place on 12 December 2026.

== See also ==
- List of indoor arenas in Australia
