= Tyson Lane =

Australian rules footballer

Personal information
- Full name: Tyson Lane
- Born: 25 August 1976 (age 50)
- Original team: Melton
- Height: 183 cm (6 ft 0 in)
- Weight: 86 kg (190 lb)

Playing career^{1}
Years	Club	Games (Goals)
1995 – 1998	Footscray/W.B.	19 (19)
1999 – 2001	Collingwood	42 (30)
Total		61 (49)
- ^{1} Playing statistics correct to the end of 2001.

Career highlights
- AFL Rising Star nominee: 1995

Tyson Lane (born 25 August 1976) is a former Australian rules footballer who played with the Western Bulldogs and Collingwood in the Australian Football League (AFL).

Lane, who was originally from Melton, started well at Footscray with a 1995 AFL Rising Star nomination on debut, in the opening round of the season. He would also receive Brownlow Medal votes for two of his first four games, including for a five-goal haul in a win over Collingwood. He managed just 10 senior games from 1996 to 1998 but played in a reserves premiership in the last of those years.

At the end of the 1998 season he asked to be traded and was swapped to Collingwood for Josh Mahoney. He missed just two games in the 1999 AFL season, kicked 22 goals and averaged 16.95 disposals.

A half forward and on-baller, he struggled for AFL games in the next two seasons and in 2003 joined the North Cairns Football Club as an assistant coach. He continued to play and in 2004 won the league's "Best and Fairest" award known as the Crathern Medal. The year however ended badly when he was involved in the now infamous grand final brawl with Port Douglas. Lane continued on at North Cairns in 2005 and the following season had a one-year stint as a coach at Manunda. In 2007 he was an assistant coach with WAFL club Swan Districts and also made two appearances on the field. He then coached Hastings in 2008 and 2009 before being appointed coach of Knox in 2010. In 2011, Lane returned to Cairns, becoming senior coach of Centrals Trinity Beach Bulldogs.
