= 1990 OMFL Grand Final =

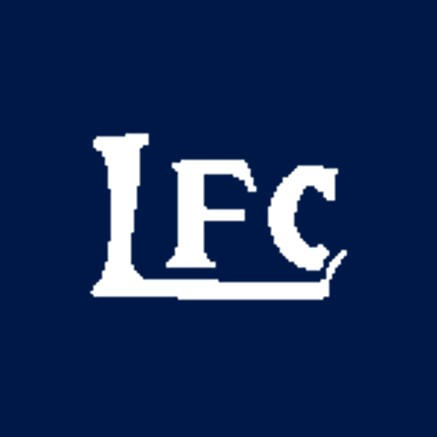

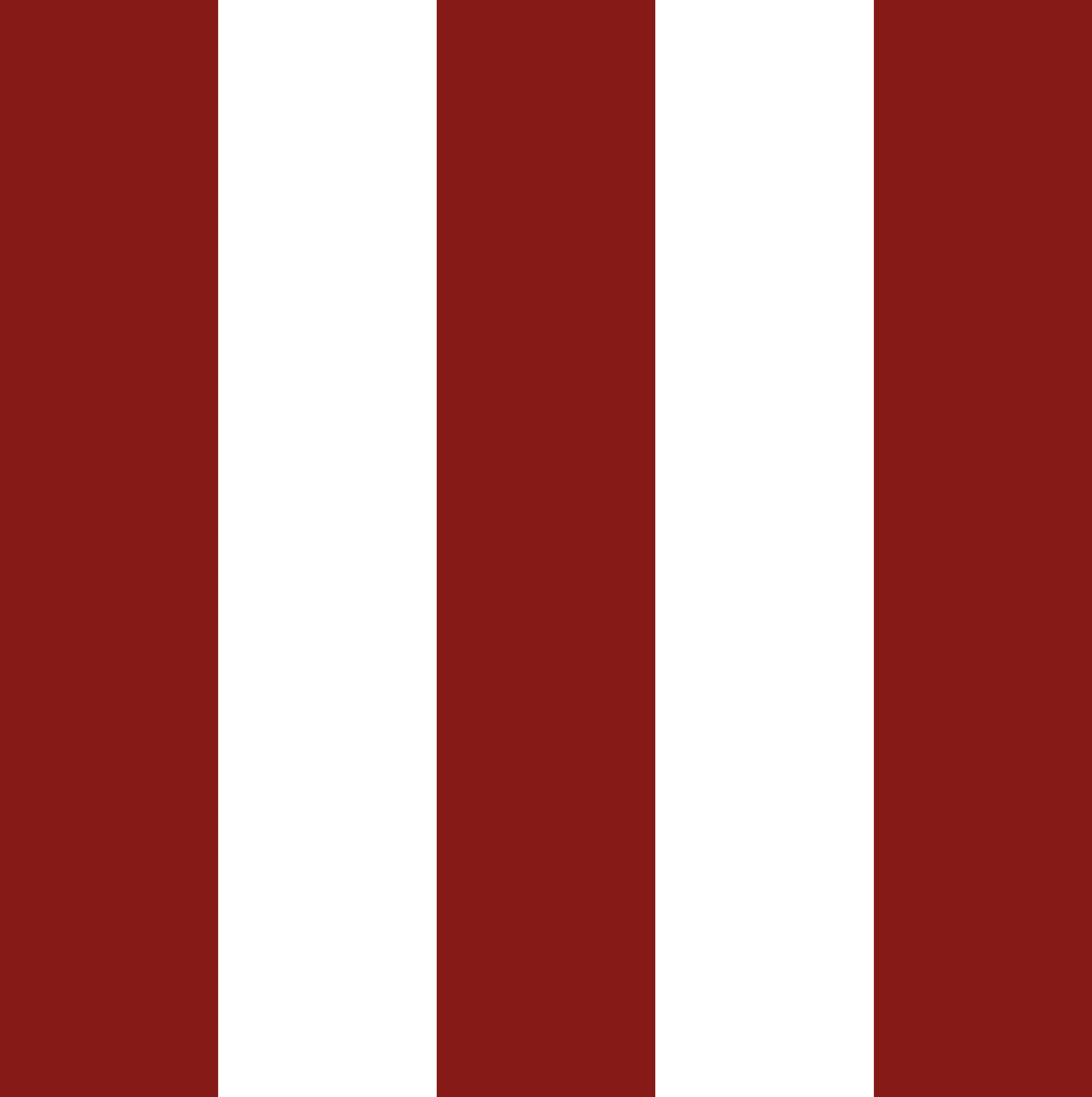
Lavington	Wodonga
8.14 (62)	10.22 (82)
	1	2	3	4
LAV	4.1 (25)	7.8 (50)	8.10 (58)	8.14 (62)
WOD	3.5 (23)	4.9 (33)	5.15 (45)	10.22 (82)
- Date: 23 September 1990
- Stadium: Albury Sports Ground
- Attendance: 8,000
- Umpires: Shane McDonald; Ken Wright

Broadcast in Australia
- Network: Prime Television
- Commentators: Nick Coe; Gavin Dainton; Merv King

The 1990 OMFL Grand Final was an Australian rules football match contested between Lavington and Wodonga at Albury Sports Ground on 23 September 1990. It was held to determine the premiers of the Ovens & Murray Football League (OMFL), a semi-professional competition based around the Ovens Murray region in New South Wales and Victoria, for the 1990 season.

The match became known as "The Bloodbath" after players were engaged in a succession of brawls early in the match. Footage of the brawls was shown around the world, and it has been described as the OMFL's "darkest day".

Wodonga won the match by 20 points, despite having trailed at the first three breaks, marking the club's fifth senior premiership. This was the second premiership for Jeff Gieschen as Wodonga coach, having coached the club to a victory in 1987, and he later went on to coach West Perth and Richmond.

The match was held following the 1990 reserves grand final, in which Lavington also played Wodonga, a match that was "equally as fiery" as the seniors.

== Match summary ==
Around a minute after the first quarter began, a brawl began between Lavington and Wodonga players, which lasted for around three minutes. Eventually, a free kick was awarded to Wodonga captain Ernest Whitehead almost directly in front of his club's goals. However, he missed and kicked a behind, in what was the first score of the match.

Ken Wright, one of the umpires on the day, recalled in 2014 that "we couldn't get the game going again because the ball had been kicked over the fence, so we didn't even have a ball".

Lavington led by just two points at quarter time. Their lead was extended to 17 points at half-time, then cut slightly to 13 points at three-quarter time, before Wodonga kicked five goals and restricted Lavington to just four points in the final quarter to win the grand final.

=== Scoreboard ===
1990 OMFL Grand Final
Sunday, 23 September	Lavington	def. by	Wodonga	Albury Sports Ground (crowd: 8,000)
4.1 (25); 7.8 (50); 8.10 (58); 8.14 (62)	Q1; Q2; Q3; Final	3.5 (23); 4.9 (33); 5.15 (45); 10.22 (82)	Umpires: McDonald, Wright; Television broadcast: Prime Television
2: K. Mansell; 1: M. Killeen, K. Bahr, A. Banes, J. Lamont, M. McGuirk, B. Wilson	Goals	3: B. Allen; 2: R. West, T. Burgess, D. Gleeson 2; 1: S. Murphy
P. Lappin, W. Pendergast, N. Shaw, B. Wilson, W. Stanlake, R. Hamilton	Best	G. Cordy, D. Greenhill, S. Murphy, B. Crothers, G. McGhee, A. Nicholls, B. Allen, D. Pevitt, E. Whitehead

== Aftermath ==
Fifteen players received a combined total of 68 matches in suspensions following the match − a combined 46 for Lavington players and 22 for Wodonga players.

Footage of the brawls, which was broadcast live on Prime Television, was shown across Australia and around the world.

== Legacy ==
Comparisons to this match were made following the 2004 AFL Cairns Grand Final between Port Douglas and North Cairns, where a brawl began moments after the conclusion of the national anthem before further fighting and the eventual stripping of the premiership against North Cairns.

A documentary on the match was released on 15 July 2023 and premiered at the Albury Regent Cinema.
