= Nick Salter =

Australian rules footballer (born 1987)

Personal information
- Full name: Nick Salter
- Born: 30 July 1987 (age 39); South Australia
- Original team: Woodville West Torrens (SANFL)
- Draft: Round 1, Pick #15, 2007 Rookie Draft
- Height: 191 cm (6 ft 3 in)
- Weight: 94 kg (207 lb)
- Positions: Key Position Forward, Key Position Defender

Playing career^{1}
Years	Club	Games (Goals)
2008–2013	Port Adelaide	21 (12)
- ^{1} Playing statistics correct to the end of 2013.

Nick Salter (born 30 July 1987) is an Australian rules footballer who played for Port Adelaide Football Club in the Australian Football League (AFL). He is currently playing for the Port Douglas Crocs of AFL Cairns.

He was drafted from the Woodville-West Torrens Football Club in the South Australian National Football League (SANFL) with the 15th selection in the 2008 Rookie draft. He previously played football in country South Australia for North Eastern Football League team South Clare.

In August 2008 he was elevated to Port's senior list, replacing Hugh Minson who had retired. A long kicking forward, he made his debut against St Kilda Football Club, despite playing the Woodville-West Torrens reserves team the previous week. He kicked 2 goals and maintained his place in the side for the following week. He missed the next week with a back injury and did not play in the AFL again until round 16 of the 2009 season, after rupturing a medial knee ligament earlier in the season. when he played five of the last seven games, kicking at least one goal in every game. His contract was extended at the end of the 2009 season. The 2010 season saw him played in defence at AFL level, and up forward at SANFL level. At the end of 2013 he was delisted by Port.
