= Albury Sports Ground =

Sporting ground in Albury, New South Wales

- A.S.G.
- Interactive map of Albury Sports Ground
- Former names: Albury Oval
- Location: Albury, New South Wales, Australia
- Coordinates: 36°4′59.19″S 146°54′31.59″E
- Owner: City of Albury
- Capacity: 8,000 approx.
- Surface: Grass (Oval)
- Scoreboard: Brick "Memorial Scoreboard"
- Record attendance: 15,000 (14 June 1952: VFL Season: South Melbourne vs. North Melbourne)

Construction
- Opened: 1859
- Renovated: 2016 (Rejected proposal)

Tenant
- Albury Tigers F.N.C. (OMFNL)

Ground information
- Country: Australia
- End names
- "East End" / "Members End" "West End"

International information

Albury Sports Ground (also known as "Albury Oval") is a sporting ground located close to the central business district of Albury, Australia. The oval is near the NSW bank of the Murray River, with a historic grandstand on the north-western flank, and a members' club with a grandstand and changing rooms on the eastern wing. The venue also incorporates a netball court in the north-eastern corner, while the Albury Swim Centre is adjacent to the west. The ground is part of a string of parks and gardens between the Murray River and Wodonga Place that include the Albury Botanic Gardens, Hovell Tree Park, Noreuil Park, Australia Park, and Oddies Creek Park.

The venue is the home ground for the Albury Football Club in the Ovens & Murray Football League, and most seasons it hosts the Ovens & Murray preliminary final.

== History ==
In November 1824, Hume and Hovell encamped near the banks of the Murray River, later known as the Albury Recreation Reserve for several days prior to crossing the Murray River into terra incognita - now the colony of Victora.

An 1856 map of Albury shows land Reserved for Public Recreation near Thurgoona St, Wodonga Place and Dean St.

In 1861, the Council Mayor, Alderman Middleton moved that a memorial be presented to Albury Reserve fronting Dean and Olive streets, be vested as a place of public recreation.

A group of local sports clubs held a meeting in March 1895 to arrange for the management of the sportsground based on the lower portion of Albury Botanic Gardens to be held by a group a Trustees, instead of the Albury Council.

In 1910 the Murray River broke its banks and flooded the park and partially flooded the Sports Ground as it can be seen in this photo.

In March 1939, the second annual Albury Athletic Club was transferred from the Albury Showgrounds to the Albury Sportsground after installation of best equipted cycling track in Australian and the added benefit of a turfed oval surface, unsurpassed in any inland town.

Between 1946 and 1959, it was the home of the North Albury Football Club, before they were relocated out to Bunton Park, North Albury. In August 1950 the oval was in a state of disrepair and made headlines in the local paper.

In 1954, the local soccer competition's grand final was played at the Albury Sportsground, with Bonegilla United, 3 goals, defeating Albury City, 2 goals for the Williamson Soccer Cup.

Between 1977 and 1981, it was the home of the South Albury Football Club, when they competed in the Tallangatta & District Football League.

In previous summers the venue was used for cricket, with a turf wicket, and in this capacity serves as the home of the Albury Tigers side in the Cricket Albury-Wodonga Provincial competition. The turf wicket was removed in the early 2000s and the cricket club was relocated.

In May 2020, the Albury Sports Ground hosted the Melbourne Storm for a pre-season training capacity in preparation for recommencing the delayed 2020 NRL Season. The Storm were originally slated to train at Albury community Rugby League venue Greenfields Park, however a decision by the Albury City Council led to the Storm requiring an alternate venue at short notice.

As of 2026, the Sports Ground has a capacity of about 8,000. In 1952 an estimated crowd of 15,000 crammed into the Sports Ground to watch an official VFL match between North Melbourne and South Melbourne, then a crowd of 13,000 attended the 1954 Ovens & Murray Football League grand final.

Facilities Development

- 1862: A portion of the Albury Recreation Reserve was set aside for the Albury Cricket Ground for the Border Cricket Club.
- 1868: Erection of fencing around the Albury Cricket Ground.
- 1872: Erection of the Border Cricket Club Pavilion.
- 1892: Erection of a new cricket pavilion after the original building was destroyed by fire in June 1891.
- 1897: Fire destroyed the cricket pavilion.
- 1915: Brick grandstand by built on western side of oval.
- 1939: Construction of a dirt cycling track
- 1950: An electric siren was installed to replace a hand-held bell to denote the end of each quarter at football matches.
- 1952: Major drainage works on the oval for quick drainage during wet weather.
- 1953: In July 1953, the Memorial Scoreboard at the Albury Sports Ground was officially opened to perpetuate, the memory of Albury sportsmen who died in World War One and World War Two.

On 28 February 2014 the Border Mail published an article titled "Lavington Oval 'in the wrong spot' for major events" in which Andrew Boyd Barber (a University of Melbourne post-graduate urban design student) said: "Albury Council should start planning for an upgraded sportsground precinct." He went on to cite the AFL's decision to sell its ground at Waverley in favour of the Docklands stadium in central Melbourne. "Waverley is an incredible oval in the middle of suburbia that now has this radiating pattern of houses," ... "People couldn't really access it that easily,". Mr Boyd Barber said Lavington Oval contained the same elements as Waverley, in that it had simply become nonviable to have a huge stadium in such a residential location. "You've got an oval on the outer fringe of an urban area that is slowly being encroached on by development,".

On 9 March 2016 the Border Mail published an article titled "Urban designer promotes plan to link new Albury aquatics centre with upgraded sportsground". ...

== International & National usage ==
=== Cricket ===
The venue hosted a World Series Cricket match on the 27th and 28th January 1977 between the World Series Cricket Cavaliers XI and the World Series Cricket World XI.

=== Australian Rules Football ===
Round 8 of the 1952 VFL season was declared "National Day Round" where all matches were held away from traditional VFL venues, and as part of this, Albury Sports Ground hosted a fixture that saw South Melbourne 18.10 (118) defeat North Melbourne 14.12 (96).

=== Rugby League ===
In May 2020, due to the COVID-19 lockdown in the state of Victoria, the Melbourne Storm utilised the training facilities in preparation for the resumption of their 2020 NRL season.

=== Rugby Union ===
It was also the venue for the rugby league tour game in 1951 where a team of virtual unknowns representing Riverina upset France, who at the time were possibly the best test nation in the world. Riverina won 20–10, thanks mostly to the boot of their fullback Koch, who kicked 7 goals.

=== Albury Gift and Wheelrace ===
The first official Albury Gift and Wheelrace was held on the Albury Showgrounds in 1938, then moved to the Albury Sports Ground in 1939, which hosted many famous international runners and cyclists.

=== Other ===
Whilst its role as Albury's main sporting venue has been superseded by the establishment of the Lavington Sports Ground in the 1970s, it has in the past hosted many Ovens and Murray Football League grand finals, the last one it hosted was the (the notorious 1990 "Bloodbath" decider between Lavington and Wodonga Bulldogs), as well as local representative Australian Rules football and cricket matches.

It has also hosted cultural events such as rock concerts and carols by candlelight, as well as hosting a stage of the Royal Tour by Queen Elizabeth II in 1988 during Australia's bicentenary of colonisation, where thousands of schoolchildren were assembled on the oval to greet the Queen.

== Links ==
- A history of the Albury Sports Ground via the Albury Historical Society
- Albury Sportsground via Austadiums
- 1906 - Albury Sports Ground photo
- 1939 - Albury Sportsground: Cycling Track photo
- 1940's - Albury Athletic Club Carnival / Albury Sports Ground photo
- 1950 - Albury Grandstand photo
- 1952 - Albury Sportsground Oval photo
- 2021 - Albury Sportsground Grandstand photo
