= 1995 AFL Rising Star =

1995 Norwich AFL Rising Star
- Sponsored by: Norwich
- Country: Australia
- Rising Star: Nick Holland (Hawthorn)

The Norwich AFL Rising Star award is given annually to a standout young player in the Australian Football League. The 1995 medal was won by Hawthorn player Nick Holland.

== Eligibility ==
Every round, an Australian Football League rising star nomination is given to a standout young player. To be eligible for the award, a player must be under 21 on January 1 of that year, have played 10 or fewer senior games and not been suspended during the season. At the end of the year, one of the 22 nominees is the winner of award.

== Nominations ==
Round	Player	Club
1	Tyson Lane	Footscray
2	Scott Camporeale	Carlton
3	Martin McKinnon	Adelaide
4	Nick Holland	Hawthorn
5	David Bourke	Richmond
6	Steven Lawrence	Brisbane Bears
7	Brad Johnson	Footscray
8	Michael O'Loughlin	Sydney
9	Austinn Jones	St Kilda
10	Shaun McManus	Fremantle
11	Matthew Capuano	North Melbourne
12	Ryan O'Connor	Essendon
13	Stuart Anderson	North Melbourne
14	Joel Smith	St Kilda
15	Adrian Whitehead	Carlton
16	Craig Callaghan	Fremantle
17	Daniel Hargraves	Footscray
18	Fraser Gehrig	West Coast
19	Justin Crawford	Sydney
20	Andrew McLeod	Adelaide
21	Stephen Jurica	Richmond
22	Aaron Lord	Geelong
Source: AFL Record Season Guide 2015
