= 2006 Top End Series =

The Top End series in 2006 was an international first-class and List A cricket series played in Darwin and Cairns in the north of Australia from 30 June to 27 July 2006. Australia A, India A, New Zealand A and Pakistan A played as well as a Northern Territory Chief Minister's XI and a Queensland XI team.

Venues included Marrara Oval and Gardens Oval in Darwin and Fretwell Park and Cazaly Stadium in Cairns.
