= Jason Love (footballer) =

Australian rules footballer (born 1965)

Personal information
- Full name: Jason Love
- Born: 3 December 1965 (age 60)
- Original team: Port Melbourne
- Height: 182 cm (6 ft 0 in)
- Weight: 86 kg (190 lb)

Playing career^{1}
Years	Club	Games (Goals)
1986–1989	North Melbourne	45 (69)
1991–1992	Sydney Swans	23 (54)
Total		68 (123)
- ^{1} Playing statistics correct to the end of 1992.

Career highlights
- Sydney Swans leading goalkicker, 1991

Jason Love (born 3 December 1965) is a former Australian rules footballer who played in the Australian Football League (AFL).

== Playing career ==
Originally from Port Melbourne Football Club in the Victorian Football Association (VFA), Love moved to the North Melbourne in 1986 and struggled for a regular run in the senior side. He went on to play with the club until 1989, playing 45 games for 69 goals.

Known as "Jack", in 1991 Love booted 52 goals in his first year at the Sydney Swans to lead their goalkicking for that year. After the 1992 season Love's AFL career ended, having played 23 games for 54 goals with the Swans.

== Coaching career ==
In the 2004 AFL Cairns Grand Final, Love, the coach of the North Cairns Tigers, instigated a wild and violent bench-clearing brawl that involved his players, fans and team officials. Love was suspended for a total of eight years by the league for a string of charges arising from the melee, including striking three opposition players and abusing and threatening the field umpires when they went to report him, and bringing the game of AFL in Queensland into disrepute, with his players being suspended for a combined total of 400 matches (with suspensions ranging from 10 matches to five years) for starting the brawl. AFL Cairns declared the Grand Final a "no result" and withheld the 2004 premiership.

Love now lives in Victoria; he had his application for an amnesty from his suspension to coach the Port Melbourne Colts rejected in 2011, but was cleared to coach at the end of 2012.
