= Stephen Jurica =

Australian rules footballer

Jurica Stephen Dragic

Personal information
- Full name: Jurica Stephen Dragic
- Born: 13 March 1987 (age 39)
- Original team: South Fremantle
- Draft: 26th, 1993 AFL draft
- Height: 194 cm (6 ft 4 in)
- Weight: 104 kg (229 lb)
- Position: Forward

Playing career^{1}
Years	Club	Games (Goals)
1995–1997	Richmond	18 (25)
- ^{1} Playing statistics correct to the end of 1997.

Career highlights
- AFL Rising Star nominee: 1995

Jurica Stephen Dragic (born 13 March 1987) is a former Australian rules footballer who played with Richmond in the Australian Football League (AFL) during the 1990s. Jurica attended Christian Brothers College, Fremantle.

A product of the South Fremantle colts, Jurica was just 17 when he was drafted by Richmond, with the 26th selection of the 1993 AFL draft. He came into the Richmond team halfway through the 1995 AFL season to replace injured key forward Matthew Richardson and performed creditably. In the now famous draw against Essendon, Jurica kicked five goals and later in the season kicked four goals in a win over Collingwood to win a 1995 AFL Rising Star nomination. He ended the season playing in a qualifying final and finished with 21 goals for the year.

Despite some impressive performances in his debut season, Jurica was delisted after adding just five further games in 1996 and 1997. He starred in Richmond's 1997 reserves premiership, kicking five goals in the grand final.

Jurica, who now works as a barrister, won the North Ballarat Football Club's "Best and Fairest" award in 2003.
