= Josh Mahoney =

Australian rules footballer, born 1977

Personal information
- Full name: Joshua William Paul Mahoney
- Born: 31 October 1977 (age 49)
- Original team: Western Jets/Williamstown
- Draft: 84th overall, 1996 AFL draft
- Height: 180 cm (5 ft 11 in)
- Weight: 83 kg (183 lb)
- Position: Half-forward flank

Playing career^{1}
| Years | Club | Games (Goals) |
| 1997–1998 | Collingwood | 19 (8) |
| 1999–2000 | Western Bulldogs | 11 (2) |
| 2004–2007 | Port Adelaide | 67 (77) |
| Total | | 97 (87) |
- ^{1} Playing statistics correct to the end of 2007.

Career highlights
- Port Adelaide premiership side 2004; Port Adelaide leading goalkicker 2006

Joshua William Paul Mahoney (born 31 October 1977) is a former professional Australian rules footballer who played for Collingwood, the Western Bulldogs, and Port Adelaide in the Australian Football League.

== VFL career ==
Mahoney played under-18s for the Western Jets in the TAC Cup. He was undrafted in the 1995 AFL draft, so he signed with the Williamstown Seagulls in the Victorian Football League (VFL), playing 19 games with them in 1996. After that season, Mahoney was selected by the Collingwood Football Club with one of the last picks in the 1996 AFL draft, pick 84.

== AFL career ==
=== Early career (1997–2000) ===
Mahoney made his Australian Football League (AFL) debut with Collingwood in round 12, 1997. He was a handy small forward for the club, and was noted for his solid kicking and courage, as well as his ability to get the "hard ball". At the end of 1998, Mahoney was traded to the Western Bulldogs for Tyson Lane. He started the year in the team but due to injury fell away and did not play a game after round 12. He was delisted at the end of 2000.

=== VFL return (2001–2003) ===
After toiling away for the Bendigo Bombers in the VFL following his delisting from the Bulldogs, Mahoney continued to impress and was a prominent player in representative matches between the VFL and the South Australian National Football League. In the 2004 pre-season draft, Port Adelaide selected Mahoney with the final pick.

=== Port Adelaide career (2004–2007) ===
He was given a lifeline and the then 26-year-old was not expected to have much of an impact at AFL level. But after breaking into the side after round 6 after solid performances for Glenelg, Mahoney never lost his spot in the team in 2004. His performances across half-forward, booting 20 goals, and his defensive pressure was important, with the journeyman winning a premiership medallion in Port Adelaide's 2004 flag-winning side. Mahoney played well in 2006, winning the Power's leading goalkicker award with 29 goals and earning himself a promotion to the onfield leadership group for season 2007. Late in 2007 Mahoney announced his retirement from the AFL, having played 97 AFL games.

=== Coaching career (2008–2011) ===
Mahoney was picked up as an assistant coach of the Melbourne Football Club for 2008. He served as a forward line coach.

=== Football Administration career (2011-present) ===
In September 2011, Mahoney was appointed Melbourne's Football Manager after Mark Neeld was appointed as senior coach.

In September 2013, Mahoney was appointed Melbourne's General Manager - Football Operations by CEO Peter Jackson.

In December 2020, Mahoney was appointed Essendon's Football Manager after the departure of Dan Richardson.

== Playing statistics ==
Legend
| G | Goals | K | Kicks | D | Disposals | T | Tackles |
| B | Behinds | H | Handballs | M | Marks |

| Season | Team | No. | Games | Totals | | | | | | | Averages (per game) | | | | | | |
| Season | Team | No. | Games | G | B | K | H | D | M | T | G | B | K | H | D | M | T |
|---|---|---|---|---|---|---|---|---|---|---|---|---|---|---|---|---|---|
| 1997 | Collingwood | 8 | 8 | 4 | 3 | 41 | 30 | 71 | 14 | 15 | 0.5 | 0.4 | 5.1 | 3.8 | 8.9 | 1.8 | 1.9 |
| 1998 | Collingwood | 8 | 11 | 4 | 4 | 75 | 45 | 120 | 23 | 22 | 0.4 | 0.4 | 6.8 | 4.1 | 10.9 | 2.1 | 2.0 |
| 1999 | Western Bulldogs | 13 | 7 | 0 | 0 | 48 | 29 | 77 | 28 | 4 | 0.0 | 0.0 | 6.9 | 4.1 | 11.0 | 4.0 | 0.6 |
| 2000 | Western Bulldogs | 13 | 4 | 2 | 5 | 12 | 17 | 29 | 8 | 2 | 0.5 | 1.3 | 3.0 | 4.3 | 7.3 | 2.0 | 0.5 |
| 2004 | Port Adelaide | 22 | 19 | 20 | 14 | 128 | 96 | 224 | 69 | 30 | 1.1 | 0.7 | 6.7 | 5.1 | 11.8 | 3.6 | 1.6 |
| 2005 | Port Adelaide | 22 | 18 | 24 | 8 | 110 | 75 | 185 | 65 | 24 | 1.3 | 0.4 | 6.1 | 4.2 | 10.3 | 3.6 | 1.3 |
| 2006 | Port Adelaide | 22 | 22 | 29 | 10 | 193 | 99 | 292 | 106 | 41 | 1.3 | 0.5 | 8.8 | 4.5 | 13.3 | 4.8 | 1.9 |
| 2007 | Port Adelaide | 22 | 8 | 4 | 8 | 55 | 47 | 102 | 31 | 15 | 0.5 | 1.0 | 6.9 | 5.9 | 12.8 | 3.9 | 1.9 |
| Career | | | 97 | 87 | 52 | 662 | 438 | 1100 | 344 | 153 | 0.9 | 0.5 | 6.8 | 4.5 | 11.3 | 3.5 | 1.6 |
