= Cazalys Stadium =

Stadium in Cairns, Queensland, Australia

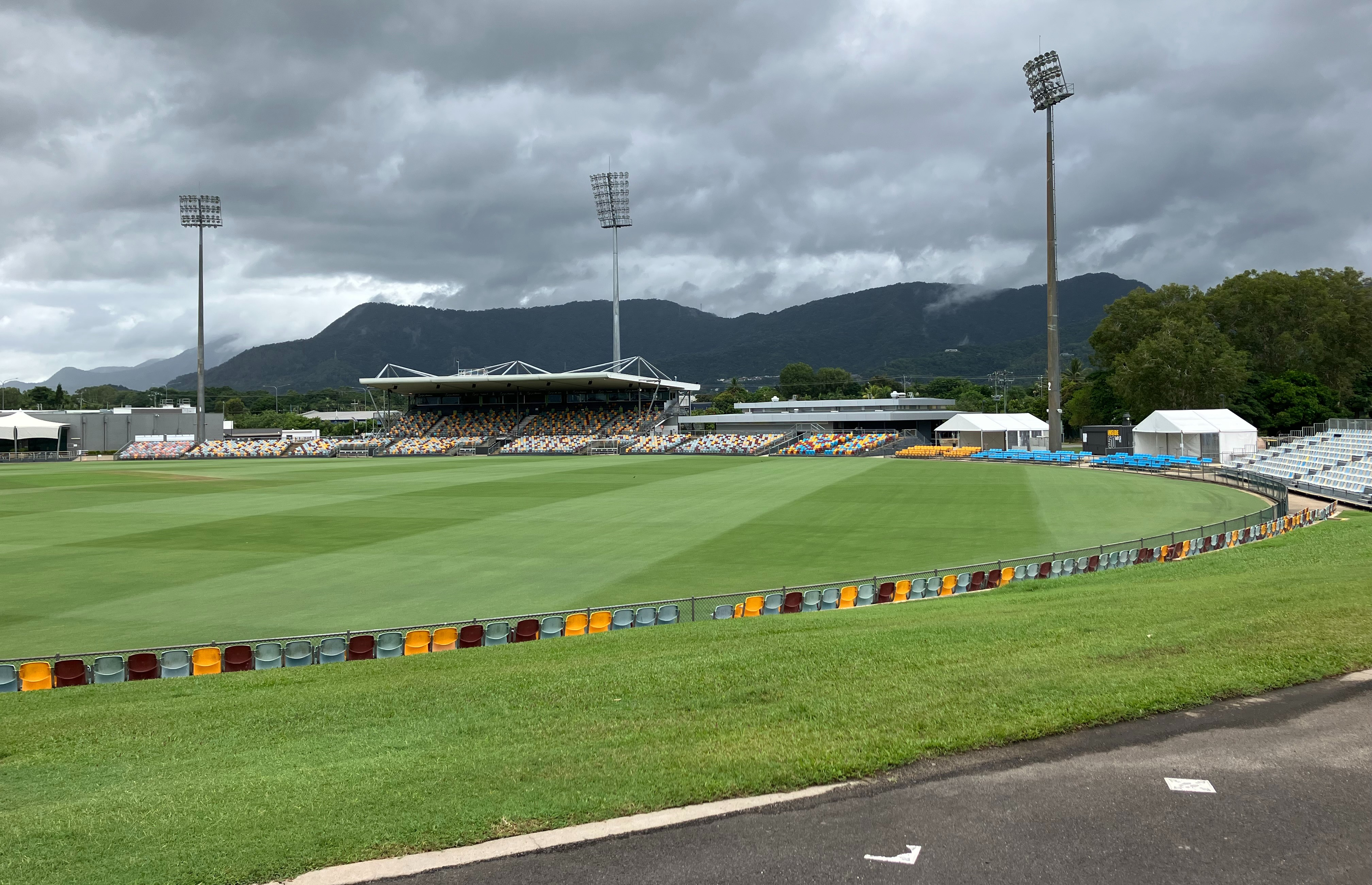
- Cazalys Stadium in December 2022
- Interactive map of Cazalys Stadium
- Former names: Bundaberg Rum Stadium (2001–2003); Australian Football Park (1957–1998)
- Location: 344 Mulgrave Road, Westcourt, Cairns, Queensland
- Coordinates: 16°56′09″S 145°44′57″E
- Owner: AFL Cairns
- Capacity: 13,500
- Surface: Grass
- Field size: 165 m × 135 m (541 ft × 443 ft)

Construction
- Opened: 1957

Tenants
- Manunda Hawks (AFL Cairns); Richmond Football Club (AFL) (2011–2013); Western Bulldogs (AFL) (2014–2017); Gold Coast Suns (AFL) 2018; St Kilda Football Club (AFL) (2021–2022); Hawthorn Football Club (AFLW) (2023-present); Brisbane Heat (BBL) (2022-present)

Ground information
- End names
- City End; Club End

International information
- First men's Test: 25–28 July 2003: Australia v Bangladesh
- Last men's Test: 9–13 July 2004: Australia v Sri Lanka
- First men's ODI: 2 August 2003: Australia v Bangladesh
- Last men's ODI: 19 August 2025: Australia v South Africa
- Only men's T20I: 16 August 2025: Australia v South Africa
- As of 11 September 2022; Source: Cricinfo

Cazalys Stadium is a sports stadium in Cairns, Queensland, Australia. It is situated in the suburb of Westcourt. The stadium is named after the social club which abuts the oval, Cazalys, which itself was named after Australian rules footballer Roy Cazaly.

With a capacity of approximately 13,500 people, Cazalys Stadium is the largest oval stadium in Cairns. It features a main grandstand relocated from the Brisbane Cricket Ground in the late 1990s. It is used by the Queensland Cricket Association, Queensland Rugby League, and AFL Cairns. The stadium has hosted matches in the Australian Football League (AFL), National Rugby League (NRL), and A-League, as well as Test and One Day International cricket. It is the third largest oval venue in Queensland which has hosted both professional AFL and cricket matches.

== History ==
In 1957 the Australian National Football Council, through Bruce Andrew, purchased land in Cairns for the first dedicated field in regional Queensland, which became Australian Football Park.

The Cairns Australian Football League, led by Kevin Crathern (then president of the CAFL), helped clear the land of trees, filled in the dense bushland, and turned the land into a suitable playing field. In 1984 the CAFL began negotiations with the ANFC in a bid to purchase the freehold of Australian Football Park. The bid would prove successful, and the CAFL made the final payment on the ground in 1994. From 1997 to 1998, $2.4 million was spent upgrading the stadium, which included acquiring the western grandstand from the Gabba and the installation of four light towers. In 1999, the CAFL purchased the adjacent 51st Battalion barracks housing property, which later became the headquarters for AFL Cairns, and renamed the ground to Cazalys Stadium after the adjoining social club. In 2008, $3 million was spent upgrading the stadium including lighting to AFL television standards, new entrance gates on Till Street, increasing the size of player dressing rooms, providing adequate first aid and medical facilities and improved coaching facilities. In 2011, a $15 million stadium redevelopment was completed, which included new grandstand and players facilities, media box and upgraded lighting.

== Sports ==
=== Cricket ===
In July and August 2003, Australia hosted Bangladesh in an out of season series in Cairns and Darwin. Cazalys Stadium hosted the 2nd Test and the first two One Day Internationals while Marrara Oval in Darwin hosted the 1st Test and 3rd ODI. Australia won all matches comfortably. In July 2004, Australia hosted Sri Lanka in a two test series with matches again in Cairns and Darwin. However, due to disappointing attendances in both series, Cairns has not hosted Australian international cricket matches since, despite the fact that, according to cricket historian Gideon Haigh, "Almost a quarter of the combined populations of Cairns and Darwin attended the cricket" during the Bangladesh Test and ODI series. In October 2008, the venue hosted a Ford Ranger Cup match between Queensland and New South Wales On 8 December 2016 Cazalys Stadium hosted a First-Class match between a Cricket Australia XI v Pakistan cricket team.

In January 2019, Cazalys Stadium hosted WBBL T20 cricket. International fixtures for the 2020-21 cricket season at Cazalys Stadium for October 2020 were announced by Cricket Australia, including T20 and ODI, hosting the West Indies cricket team and the New Zealand women's national cricket team respectively. Planned international fixtures announced for 2020 were subject to prevailing COVID-19 circumstances and the international women's matches were relocated to Allan Border Field in Albion, Queensland in Brisbane after the schedules were announced due to the prevailing circumstances and logistical issues at the time.

In July 2022, it was announced that Cazalys Stadium would make its BBL debut, with the Brisbane Heat to hold their BBL12 season opener against the Melbourne Renegades on 15 December.

In September 2022, the stadium hosted New Zealand for three ODIs, the first international cricket matches in Cairns since 2004. Australia won the series 3–0.

In 2025, Cazalys hosted its first T20I, the final match between Australia and South Africa. It also hosted the first of three ODIs between the same two teams.

==== Test centuries ====
As of July 2004, seven Test centuries have been scored in Cairns.

No.	Score	Player	Team	Opposing team	Date	Result
1	177	Darren Lehmann	Australia	Bangladesh	25 July 2003	Australia won
2	156*	Steve Waugh	Australia	Bangladesh	25 July 2003	Australia won
3	100*	Martin Love	Australia	Bangladesh	25 July 2003	Australia won
4	162	Justin Langer	Australia	Sri Lanka	9 July 2004	Match drawn
5	117	Matthew Hayden	Australia	Sri Lanka	9 July 2004	Match drawn
6	133	Marvan Atapattu	Sri Lanka	Australia	9 July 2004	Match drawn
7	132	Matthew Hayden	Australia	Sri Lanka	9 July 2004	Match drawn

==== ODI centuries ====
As of September 2022, one ODI century has been scored in Cairns.

No.	Score	Player	Team	Opposing team	Date	Result
1	105	Steven Smith	Australia	New Zealand	11 September 2022	Australia won

==== Test five-wicket hauls ====
As of July 2004, only two bowlers have taken five-wicket hauls at the venue - both bowlers took 10 wickets in the match.

No.	Figures	Player	Team	Opposing team	Date	Result
1	5/77	Stuart MacGill	Australia	Bangladesh	25 July 2003	Australia won
2	5/56	Stuart MacGill	Australia	Bangladesh	25 July 2003	Australia won
3	5/109	Upul Chandana	Sri Lanka	Australia	9 July 2004	Match drawn
4	5/101	Upul Chandana	Sri Lanka	Australia	9 July 2004	Match drawn

==== ODI five-wicket hauls ====
As of August 2025, two ODI five-wicket hauls have been taken at the venue.

No.	Figures	Player	Team	Opposing team	Date	Result
1	5/35	Adam Zampa	Australia	New Zealand	8 September 2022	Australia won
2	5/33	Keshav Maharaj	South Africa	Australia	19 August 2025	South Africa won

=== Rugby league ===
In 2001, the stadium hosted two National Rugby League matches, both involving the North Queensland Cowboys. Crowds of 13,000 and 6,113 attended the matches.

=== Australian rules football ===
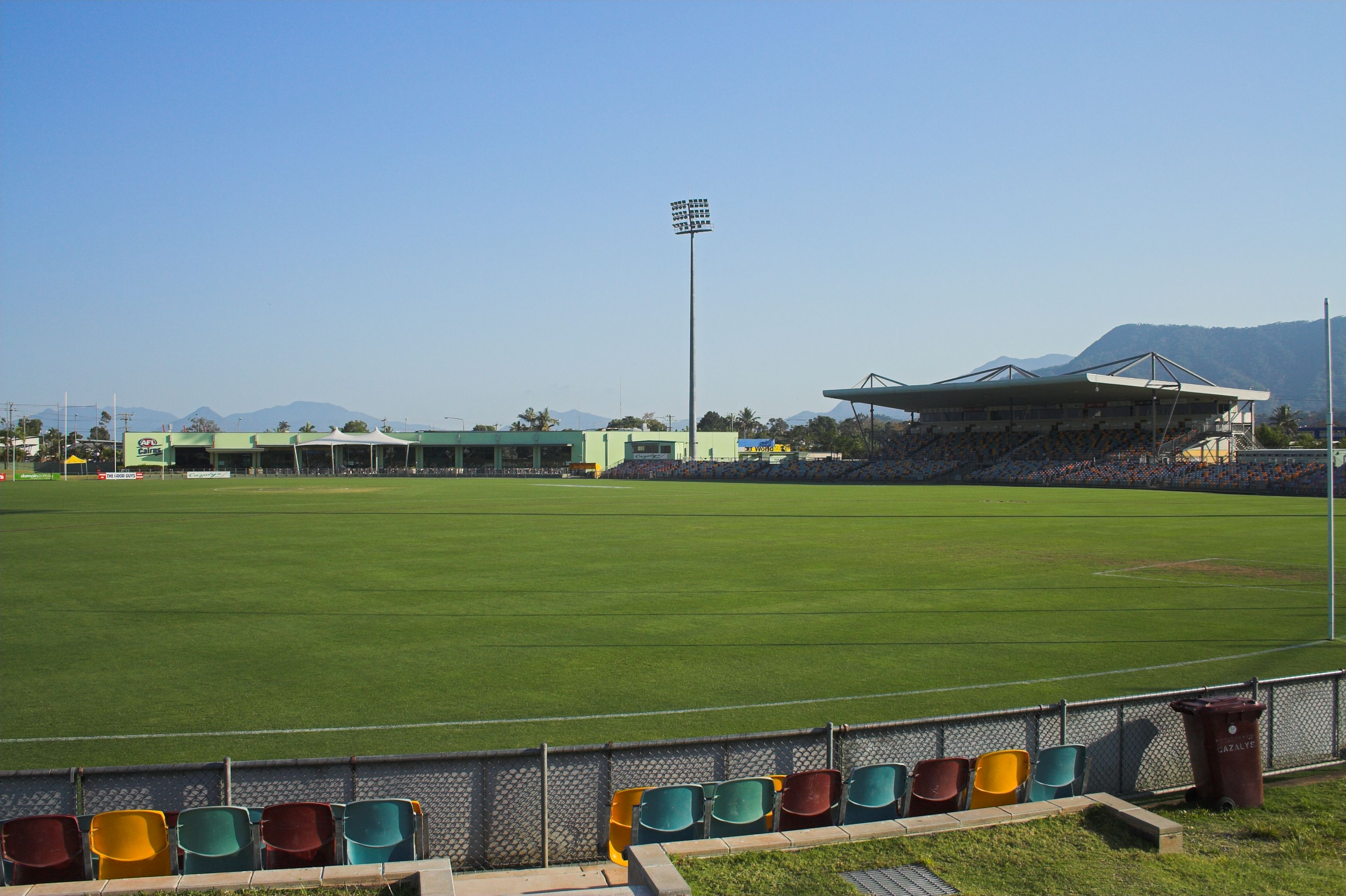
Cazalys Stadium in 2007

Cazalys Stadium hosts Australian rules football matches during the winter. AFL Cairns is headquartered at Cazalys Stadium; the league's Manunda Hawks plays its home matches at the stadium, and all AFL Cairns finals are played at the stadium.

18th, September 2004, Port Douglas Crocs and North Cairns Tigers contested the Grand Final, which was marred by violence, starting at the end of the national anthem, and continued during the game, with further violence in the stands. Although North Cairns won the game, they were stripped of the premiership 3 months later.

The venue hosted AFL pre-season matches each season from 2000 until 2007; and its first Australian Football League match for premiership points in 2011. The Richmond Football Club played a home-away-from-home match against the newly established Gold Coast Football Club in each of the 2011, 2012 and 2013 AFL seasons; sellout crowds of 10,382, 10,961 and 11,197 attended the three matches. The Western Bulldogs replaced Richmond in hosting the Suns in Cairns from the 2014 AFL season. In the first round the 2018 AFL season, the Gold Coast replaced the Bulldogs as the home team and hosted North Melbourne as Gold Coast's regular home ground Metricon Stadium was unavailable due to preparations for the 2018 Commonwealth Games.

In the 2020 AFL season. the Fremantle Dockers and Sydney Swans relocated temporarily to Cairns with officials and support staff for football matches played at Cazalys Stadium. From rounds 15 to 18, Cairns hosted one match per round, featuring either Sydney or Fremantle.

The 2021 AFL season fixture saw St Kilda play their round 13 home game against Adelaide at the venue, with the match replacing the Saints' annual match in Shanghai, China, which was cancelled due to the COVID-19 pandemic. St Kilda returned to Cazalys Stadium in round 7 of the 2022 season, when they played Port Adelaide.

=== Soccer ===
Cazalys Stadium hosted its first A-League match between Brisbane Roar and Wellington Phoenix on Saturday, 12 December 2015. Brisbane won the game 2–1.

=== Other events ===
In June 2013 the stadium hosted a Nitro Circus Live show during its 2013 Australian Regional Tour. A crowd of around 10,000 people attended the event.

=== Notable games ===
- Australia hosted the first international Test cricket match played outside of an Australian capital city against Bangladesh from 25 to 28 July 2003. Australia defeated Bangladesh by an innings and 98 runs.
- Australia hosted the 2nd Test in its series against Sri Lanka from 9–13 July 2004. The match ended in a draw.
- AFL club Gold Coast Suns won their third AFL home and away season game on 16 July 2011, winning a tough and hard-fought game against Richmond 12.13 (85) to 9.16 (70)
- Gold Coast Suns won its first match of the 2012 AFL home and away season on 14 July 2012, ending a twenty-one match losing streak by defeating Richmond 13.12 (90) to 13.10 (88). With 30 seconds left in the 4th quarter the Gold Coast Suns trailed by 10 points, but kicked two goals including one after the siren by rugby league convert Karmichael Hunt to win the match.

== Attendance records ==
Top 10 sports attendance records
No.	Date	Teams	Sport	Competition	Crowd
1	10 March 2001	North Queensland Cowboys v. Penrith Panthers	Rugby league	NRL	13,500
2	13 July 2013	Richmond Tigers v. Gold Coast Suns	Australian rules football	AFL	11,197
3	14 July 2012	Richmond Tigers v. Gold Coast Suns	Australian rules football	AFL	10,961
4	16 July 2011	Richmond Tigers v. Gold Coast Suns	Australian rules football	AFL	10,832
5	12 July 2014	Western Bulldogs v. Gold Coast Suns	Australian rules football	AFL	9,746
6	19 February 2005	Brisbane Lions v. Melbourne Demons	Australian rules football	AFL (preseason)	9,486
5	11 July 2015	Western Bulldogs v. Gold Coast Suns	Australian rules football	AFL	9,449
8	22 July 2017	Western Bulldogs v. Gold Coast Suns	Australian rules football	AFL	9,364
9	16 July 2016	Western Bulldogs v. Gold Coast Suns	Australian rules football	AFL	8,509
10	2 August 2003	Australia v. Bangladesh	Cricket	ODI	8,308

^{Last updated on 23 July 2017}

== Sources ==
- AFL Attendance Records
- NRL Attendance Records

== See also ==
- List of Test cricket grounds
- List of sports venues named after individuals
