= 2004 AFL Cairns Grand Final =

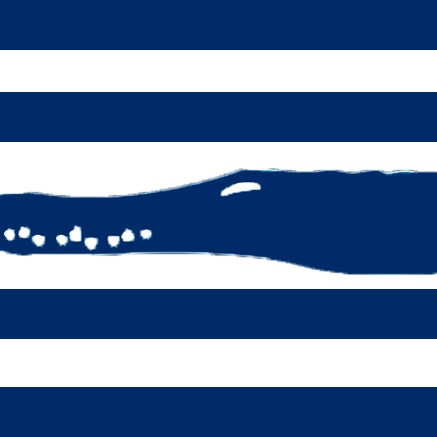

Port Douglas	North Cairns
8.10 (58)	16.10 (106)
- Date: 18 September 2004
- Stadium: Bundaberg Rum Stadium

The 2004 AFL Cairns Grand Final was an Australian rules football match contested between Port Douglas and North Cairns at Bundaberg Rum Stadium on 18 September 2004. It was held to determine the premiers of the AFL Cairns competition, a semi-professional competition in Cairns, Queensland, for the 2004 season.

Before the match began, a brawl began moments after the conclusion of the national anthem. Further fighting occurred on the field and in the crowd during the match.

North Cairns, who were seen as underdogs going into the match, won the match by 48 points, giving the club their first premiership since 1988. However the premiership was stripped following a lengthy investigation, with no premiers awarded for the 2004 season.

The grand final gained national media attention, and is considered one of the ugliest moments in the history of Australian rules football.

== Background ==
North Cairns (nicknamed the "Tigers") was a founding member of the AFL Cairns competition (then known as Cairns AFL) in 1956, while Port Douglas (nicknamed the "Crocs") had joined in 1989. The clubs were bitter rivals.

The coach of North Cairns was Jason Love, a former VFL/AFL player who played 68 games for North Melbourne and Sydney from 1986 until 1992, while Port Douglas was coached by Andy Viola.

The previous grand final in 2003 had been won by South Cairns, who defeated North Cairns by 36 points.

=== Finals series ===
Port Douglas defeated North Cairns by 65 points in the second semi-final, however the Tigers were still able to qualify for the grand final after defeating Cairns in the preliminary final.

	Semi-finals
Saturday, 4 September	South Cairns 11.17 (83)	def. by	Cairns 15.14 (104)
Sunday, 5 September	North Cairns 9.5 (59)	def. by	Port Douglas 18.16 (124)

	Preliminary final
Saturday, 11 September	North Cairns 16.15 (111)	def.	Cairns 10.5 (65)

== Match summary ==
Moments after the rendition of "Advance Australia Fair" was completed, North Cairns players charged at the Port Douglas players. A brawl immediately began, with some club officials and spectators joining in before the match had officially begun.

The brawl, which involved all 44 players, eventually ended when umpires ran to the centre of the field and bounced the ball to start the game. Fighting continued on the field throughout the game between the two teams.

A junior exhibition match that was scheduled for half-time was cancelled after parents left the stadium with their children. Video broadcast on Nine News showed a North Cairns supporter punching another man in the face as fighting continued.

Six police units were called to the stadium, with a 36-year-old woman arrested for obstructing police and contravening directions. A police spokesman later said officers were "too busy breaking up fights" to make more than one arrest.

North Cairns won the game by 48 points. Medal presentations were not held out of fear for more violence, and Port Douglas players almost fought with spectators as they left the field. Some fighting continued in the crowd following the final siren.

=== Scoreboard ===
	2004 AFL Cairns Grand Final
Saturday, 18 September	Port Douglas 8.10 (57)	def. by	North Cairns 16.10 (106)	Bundaberg Rum Stadium
Match declared "no result" on 23 December 2004

== Aftermath ==
=== Immediate reactions ===
The brawl made national news, including reports on Nine News and Ten News in Brisbane the following night.
Port Douglas coach Andy Viola said that "all week [...] Jason Love had indicated it was going to be fiery, he was in the radio, in the paper, saying 'watch for the start of the game'".

On 20 September, two days after the match, an investigation was formally launched. The probe was headed by Jim Henry, a former Crown prosecutor and future Supreme Court of Queensland judge.

A report into the brawl was handed down in October following a short delay. It was the lengthiest investigation in the history of Australian rules football.

=== Penalties ===
On 23 December 2004, AFL Cairns handed down suspensions for all 22 North Cairns players. The length of the suspensions ranged from ten matches to five years, and totalled 400 weeks. Only two players pleaded guilty.

AFL Cairns said the tribunal had targeted only North Cairns players because of their actions before the brawl occurred. North Cairns' coach Jason Love, who was banned from coaching for three years after being found guilty of striking, described the tribunal as "a witch hunt with a foregone conclusion".

On 24 February 2005, Love was given a ban of eight years from coaching, to be served concurrently with the three-year ban, after being found guilty of "bringing the game into disrepute".

Love attempted to have his eight-year ban ended in 2010, but was unsuccessful. It was eventually ended on 15 January 2013 after he appealed to AFL Victoria, having since moved away from Queensland.

== Legacy ==
In 2015, AFL Queensland called the brawl "one of the ugliest incidents in Australian rules football history", and the game has also been compared to the infamous 1990 "bloodbath" grand final in the Ovens & Murray Football League.

The Cairns Post has described it as "one of the darkest days in Far North Queensland sport" and one of the most infamous moments in Cairns sporting history.
