= Daniel Hargraves =

Australian rules footballer

Personal information
- Born: 6 December 1975 (age 50)
- Original team: Eastern U18 (U18 VMFL)
- Debut: Round 10, 1994, Footscray vs. Carlton, at Princes Park

Playing career^{1}
Years	Club	Games (Goals)
1994–1997	Footscray	38 (62)
1998–1999	Fremantle	3 (0)
Total		41 (62)
- ^{1} Playing statistics correct to the end of 1999.

Career highlights
- AFL Rising Star nominee 1995; Ken Farmer Medalist: 2002

Daniel Hargraves (born 6 December 1975) is a former Australian rules footballer who played for the Western Bulldogs and Fremantle in the Australian Football League.

He was originally drafted by the Bulldogs from the Eastern Under 18 side in the Under 18 Victorian Metropolitan Football League with selection 27 in the 1994 AFL pre-season draft. After playing 38 games over four seasons, he was traded to Fremantle in return for selection 18, which was used by the Bulldogs to draft Mark Alvey. Hargraves would play only three games for Fremantle in two seasons before being delisted at the end of the 1999 season.

He then moved to South Australia to play for North Adelaide in the South Australian National Football League (SANFL) where he won the Ken Farmer Medal in 2002 as the SANFL's leading goal kicker with 68 goals. Hargraves moved to Port Adelaide Magpies in 2007 and was their leading goalscorer in 2008. He retired from SANFL football at the end of the 2008 season, and signed to play for Nhill in the Wimmera Football League. In 2019 he signed with the Mannum Roos in the River Murray Football League.
