= Ryan O'Connor =

Australian rules footballer (born 1974)

Personal information
- Full name: Ryan O'Connor
- Born: 27 June 1974 (age 52)
- Height: 192 cm (6 ft 4 in)
- Weight: 107 kg (236 lb)

Playing career^{1}
Years	Club	Games (Goals)
1994–1998	Essendon	63 (47)
1999–2000	Sydney	24 (2)
Total		87 (49)
- ^{1} Playing statistics correct to the end of 2000.

Career highlights
- AFL Rising Star nominee: 1995

Ryan O'Connor (born 27 June 1974) is a former Australian rules football player. He is best known for playing for the Essendon Bombers and Sydney Swans in the Australian Football League. He then continued his career in the SANFL with the Port Adelaide Magpies where he won the Magarey Medal. He finished his career with VFL club Coburg in 2005 after winning the Best & Fairest in 2004. O'Connor, from Ulverstone, Tasmania, began his career at the Essendon reserves after being traded by Geelong in the 1991 AFL draft for ruckman John Barnes. Even as a young man, O'Connor was known for his massive size (191 cm, 110 kg), considered large even for an AFL player. Despite his bulk and struggle with weight problems, he was surprisingly agile and could take strong contested marks.

== Career ==
O'Connor, from Ulverstone, Tasmania, began his career at the Essendon reserves after being traded by Geelong in the 1991 AFL draft for ruckman John Barnes. Even as a young man, O'Connor was known for his massive size (191 cm, 110 kg), considered large even for an AFL player. Despite his bulk and struggle with weight problems, he was surprisingly agile and could take strong contested marks.

One of O'Connor's most notable years was 1995. He became a centre half forward and saw many successful games.

In 1997 O'Connor was involved in a car accident which gad an effect on his form. He was subsequently delisted by the Bombers.

The Sydney Swans picked up O'Connor and used him at centre half forward and centre half back. After a few reasonable seasons, he was delisted at the end of 2000.

The Port Adelaide Magpies picked up O'Connor, where he starred, winning the Magarey Medal in 2001, alongside former St Kilda player Tony Brown.

O'Connor then moved back to Melbourne in 2004, and joined Coburg, winning the Best & Fairest that year. Retiring midway through 2005, he would then take on the role of General Manager, a role he held until 2009. O'Connor is currently the Talent Manager with TAC Cup side Sandringham Dragons where he has been since 2010.
