= Nick Holland =

Australian rules footballer, born 1974

Personal information
- Born: 29 July 1974 (age 52); Adelaide, Australia
- Original team: North Adelaide (SANFL)
- Debut: Round 3, 8 April 1994, Hawthorn vs. North Melbourne, at MCG
- Height: 195 cm (6 ft 5 in)
- Weight: 97 kg (214 lb)

Playing career^{1}
Years	Club	Games (Goals)
1994–2005	Hawthorn	179 (239)
- ^{1} Playing statistics correct to the end of 2005.

Career highlights
- AFL Rising Star: 1995; Peter Crimmins Memorial Trophy: 2000

Nick ‘Dutchy’ Holland (born 29 July 1974) is a former professional Australian rules football player who played 179 games for Australian Football League (AFL) club Hawthorn between 1994 and 2005, serving as Vice Captain between 1999 and 2003. Holland is an AFL Rising Star Award winner, a best and fairest and leading goal kicker at Hawthorn and represented Australia in International Rules. He is now CEO of the EJ Whitten Foundation.

== Football career ==
=== AFL career ===
Originally from South Australian National Football League (SANFL) club North Adelaide, Holland was recruited by Hawthorn at the 1992 AFL draft. Holland made his senior AFL debut in Round 3, 1994 against North Melbourne Football Club at the Melbourne Cricket Ground (MCG) at full-back. In 1995 Holland was tried at centre-half forward and was awarded the Norwich Rising Star Award that season and achieved a second placing in Hawthorn's Best and Fairest award. Holland was Hawthorn's leading goalkicker in 1997 and 2000, when he also won the club best and fairest award in a tie with Daniel Chick.

During 2001, Holland suffered injuries to both shoulders and his thigh but recovered in time to play in the finals. At the end of 2001, Holland signed a contract, worth millions of dollars, to play for Hawthorn for four more years.

=== End of career ===
Holland retired from AFL football at the end of the 2005 season, following a shoulder injury. Holland had played 179 games for Hawthorn and kicked 239 goals.

== After football ==
Holland studied during his AFL career obtaining both a Science Degree and a Law Degree and was admitted as a solicitor to the Supreme Court of Victoria in March 2007. He began working for the Labor Party lawyers, Holding Redlich followed by the Australian Sports Commission in Canberra.

Holland is an executive director of the Sports Law Committee. He also plays in the E. J. Whitten Legends Game, in which he Captained the All Stars teams in 2007 and 2008.

Holland also recently became a member of the VFL Tribunal.

=== Media profile ===
Holland made several appearances on the panel of The Footy Show and the 'Rex Hunt Footy Show' during his football career and has hosted the football-related children's television show Totally Footy on Channel 10, and Channel 7's Around the Grounds.

Co-hosted SEN's 'Ford League Teams' and 'Sunday Sports Central' and 3AW 'Sports Today' with Gerard Healy.

Holland is currently an Australian Broadcasting Corporation (ABC) columnist, writes for Melbourne-based newspaper The Age and makes regular appearances on the ABC News show The Drum.

== Awards and achievements ==
- 1995: Norwich Rising Star
- 1997 and 2000: Hawthorn leading goalkicker
- 1998: International Rules selection
- 1996–1999: Represented South Australia (Vice Captain in 1998)
- 1999–2003: Hawthorn Vice Captain
- 2000: Peter Crimmins Medal
- 2007 Admitted to the Supreme Court of Victoria
