= South Melbourne Football Club =

South Melbourne Football Club can refer to:

- Sydney Swans, an Australian rules football club known as the South Melbourne Football Club until 1982
- South Melbourne FC, a soccer club formerly known as South Melbourne SC, Hellas Hakoah and South Melbourne Hellas
- South Melbourne Districts Football Club, an Australian rules football club
