= Albury Botanic Gardens =

Botanical garden

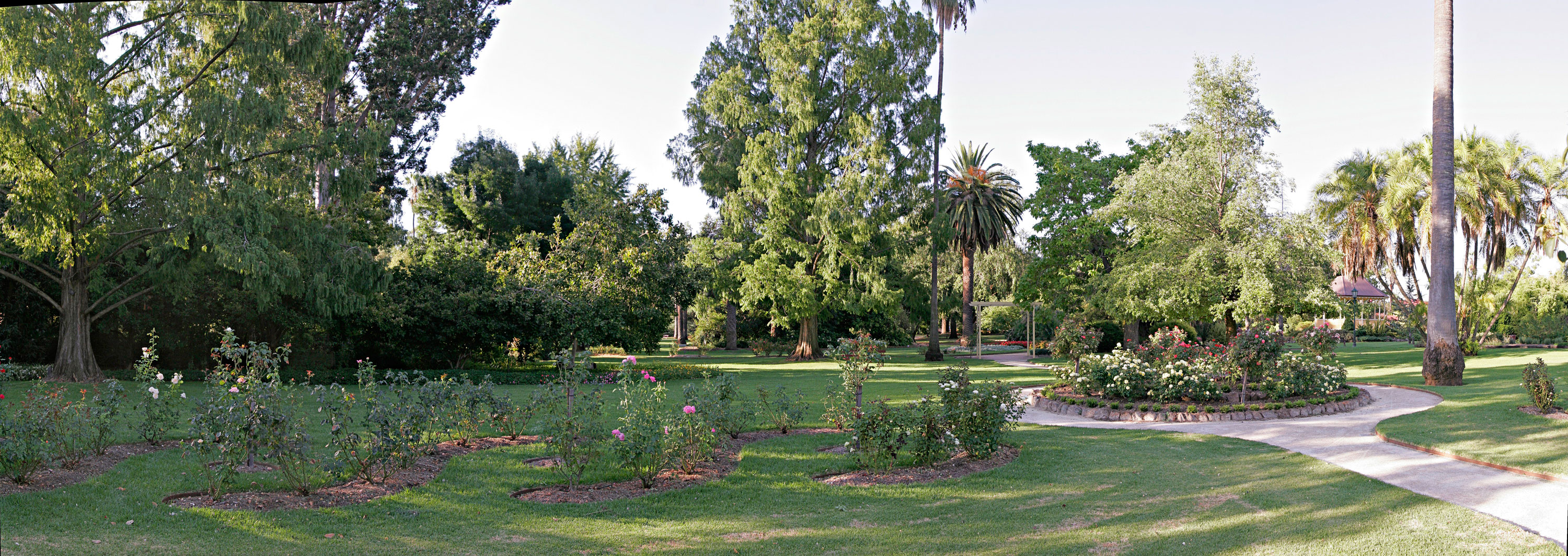
- Albury Botanic Gardens
- Interactive map of Albury Botanic Gardens
- Type: Botanical
- Location: Albury, New South Wales
- Coordinates: 36.0810°S 146.9090°E
- Area: 4 hectares (9.9 acres)
- Opened: 1877
- Owner: Albury City Council
- Operator: Friends of the Albury Botanic Gardens

The Albury Botanic Gardens are a botanical garden located in the city of Albury, New South Wales, Australia. The garden was established in 1877 and forms an example of the mainstream ideas about gardening in the 19th and 20th centuries. It covers an area of 4 hectares (9.9 acres) and specialises in Australian rainforest specimens.

The garden is maintained by the City of Albury and provides free entrance.
