= Fretwell Park =

Cricket ground in Cairns, Queensland

Coordinates: 17°00′17.46″S 145°44′14.68″E

- Fretty
- Interactive map of Fretwell Park

Ground information
- Location: Bentley Park, Cairns, Australia
- Country: Australia
- Establishment: 2006 (first recorded match)
- Capacity: 5000

Team information
South Cairns Cutters
- As of 21 October 2011; Source: Ground profile

Fretwell Park is a cricket ground in Cairns, Queensland, Australia. The ground held a first-class match in 2006 when New Zealand Whites played Pakistan A as part of the 2006 Top End series. The match was abandoned due to rain, as a result it was decided to replace the match with two List A games between the sides. AFL is also played on this ground by the South Cairns Cutters.
