= AFL Cairns =

Australian rules football league

Coordinates: 16°56′06″S 145°44′55″E

- Most recent season or competition: 2024 AFL Queensland season
- Formerly: Cairns Australian Football League
- Sport: Australian rules football
- Founded: 1956; 70 years ago
- CEO: Craig Lees
- President: David Williams
- No. of teams: 9 (7 Senior and Junior, 2 Junior Only)
- Most recent champion: North Cairns (2025)
- Most titles: Cairns Saints (13)
- Website: aflcairns.com.au

AFL Cairns is a semi-professional Australian rules football league that includes clubs from the Cairns region in Queensland, Australia. It is widely regarded as the strongest regional Australian rules football league in Queensland and has a large base at Cazalys Stadium which has staged Australian Football League matches.

The league has significant coverage in local media such as The Cairns Post. Each year the senior men's Grand Final attracts between 2,500 and 3,500 spectators.

AFL Cairns runs a men's competition with seniors and reserves divisions, as well as a women's and junior competitions.

== History ==
=== Early football matches in Cairns ===
An article in the Cairns Post on 3 September 1885 on page 3 titled "Football Match" describes a game of football played at the then cricket grounds, believed to have been in the precinct around Munro Martin Park and the Civic Theatre. This game was between Cairns, led by Jack MacNamara (believed to have been a representative of Victoria at first intercolonial match) and Townsville, led by F Rendall. References are made of "Little Marks" and the final score after 2 hours was Cairns, 1 goal 7 behinds to Townsville, 1 goal 3 behinds. The Cairns umpire was AJ Draper.

The Cairns team was :- Michelle Burke, Leonie Burke, J Swallow, "Little" Draper, Reid, Crawford, Horse, Campbell, Warren, Harrison, McClelland, Oldham, Rev.Nobbs, Grcnsen, J.Loridan, Bulcock, Wood, Ärmstrong, C.Loridan, Johnstone, D. Wall, Middlebrook, Schumhronk, Dent, McCarthy, Hogarth.

T. H. LAKE was the secretary.

In 1932 a new association was formed with 30 members and called upon Melbourne teams to play an exhibition match and assistance from the Australian National Football Council. In its first match combined Cairns-Gordonvale team defeated a team from Tully 9 goals 9 to 5 goals 10. However the competition was shortlived.

This Cairns Football Club was formed sometime between 1884 and 1886 and played matches against Townsville which continued into 1886.

During World War II, calls were put out for the organisation of local matches and at least one such match was played in Gordonvale on 19 March 1942. A Cairns Charity league was set up that year featuring four service teams based in Cairns - RAAF, two Army teams and a navy team. The services league lasted just one season. In 1944, a one-off match was organised between the Triangles and Locals.

=== Cairns Australian Football League ===
The modern league as we now know it formed in 1955 as the Cairns Australian Football League and a local schoolboy competition was also formed resulting in a junior representative trip to Townsville by plane. In 1957 the ANFC, through Bruce Andrew, purchased land in Cairns for the first dedicated field in regional Queensland which became Cazalys Stadium. The initial Senior competition had only two teams, Norths and Souths. This has since expanded to seven teams.

Around 2000, the league affiliated with the Australian Football League and was re-branded AFL Cairns. The league has grown rapidly in recent years with the ongoing development of Cazalys Stadium, the success of the Queensland-based Brisbane Lions, and with Cairns hosting exhibition Australian Football League matches and later matches for premiership points.

The league introduced a Women's Footy competition in 2002.

=== 2004 grand final ===
In the 2004 Grand Final between North Cairns and Port Douglas, a brawl began moments after the conclusion of the national anthem before the start of the match. Further fighting occurred on the field and in the crowd during the match.

North Cairns, who were seen as underdogs going into the match, won the match by 48 points, giving the club their first premiership since 1988. However the premiership was stripped following a lengthy investigation, with no premiers awarded for the 2004 season.

The grand final gained national media attention, and is considered one of the ugliest moments in the history of Australian rules football.

=== Manunda Hawks' Omission from the 2015 season ===
In 2014, the Manunda Hawks forfeited a game as the away team against Port Douglas due to the concern for the safety of a player that was threatened via social media.
The league reacted by suspending the club for the 2015 season.

== Clubs ==
=== Current ===
Locations of the AFL Cairns clubs. Yellow = Junior only.

Club	Colours	Nickname	Home Ground	Est.	Years in CAFL	Senior Premierships	
Club	Colours	Nickname	Home Ground	Est.	Years in CAFL	Total	Years
Cairns (Westcourt 1988-92)		Saints	Griffiths Park, Manunda	1993	1993-	13	1994, 1995, 1996, 1998, 1999, 2000, 2002, 2008, 2009, 2010, 2012, 2013, 2015
Cairns City (City United 1970-1998)		Lions	Holloways Beach Sporting Complex, Holloways Beach	1969	1970-	4	1982, 1983, 2021, 2022
Centrals-Trinity Beach (Centrals-Aloomba 1963-88)		Bulldogs	Crathern Park, Trinity Beach	1963	1963-	12	1967, 1969, 1973, 1974, 1975, 1978, 1979, 1989, 1990, 1992, 1993, 1997
Manunda		Hawks	Cazalys Stadium, Westcourt	1983	1984-	4	1987, 2006, 2007, 2011
North Cairns		Tigers	Watsons Oval, Manunda	1955	1956-	11	1958, 1959, 1976. 1977, 1980, 1981, 1984, 1985, 1986, 1988, 2025
Port Douglas		Crocs	Port Douglas Sporting Complex, Port Douglas	1989	1989-	11	1991, 2001, 2005, 2014, 2016, 2017, 2018, 2019, 2020, 2023, 2026
South Cairns (South Balaclava 1963-83)		Cutters	Fretwell Park, Bentley Park	1956	1956-	10	1956, 1963, 1964, 1965, 1966, 1968, 1971, 1972, 2003, 2024

=== Former ===
Club	Colours	Nickname	Home Ground	Est.	Years in CAFL	Senior Premierships		Fate
Club	Colours	Nickname	Home Ground	Est.	Years in CAFL	Total	Years	Fate
Aloomba-Gordonvale			Alley Park, Gordonvale	1957	1957-1963	1	1960	Merged with Centrals to form Centrals-Aloomba in 1964
Babinda		Magpies	Bill Wakeham Park, Babinda	1958	1958-1979	3	1961, 1962, 1970	Merged with Innisfail after 1979 season
Balaclava		Eagles		1960	1960-1962	0	-	Merged with South Cairns to form South Balaclava in 1963
Cairns Stingers		Stingers	Watsons Oval #2	2007	2024	0	-	Division 3 side only. Active AFL Masters team
Centrals			Australian Football Park, Westcourt	1958	1958-1963	0	-	Merged with Aloomba-Gordonvale to form Centrals-Aloomba in 1964
Innisfail		Roos	Callender Park, Innisfail	1956	1957-1958, 1980, 1982-1983	0	-	Folded after 1983 season
Mareeba		Saints	Mareeba State High School Oval	1983	1983-1986	0	-	Folded after 1982 season
Pyramid Power	(2006-?)(?-2020)	Power	Maher Road Oval, Gordonvale	2006	2006-2020	0	-	Folded after 2020 season
Tolga-Tinaroo (Tinnaroo Falls 1957)		Dambusters	Oval near Bones Knob, Tolga	1956	1957-1958	1	1957	Folded after 1958 season
Townsville Eagles		Eagles	Townsville Showground, West End	1987	1987-1988	0	-	Folded after 1988 season

== Junior clubs ==
=== Current ===
- Centrals Trinity Beach
- South Cairns Cutters
- Port Douglas
- North Cairns Tigers
- Manunda Hawks
- Cape York Eagles
- Cairns Saints
- Cairns City Lions
- Gordonvale Suns

=== Former ===
- Tableland Pythons
- Redlynch Lions
- Babinda Magpies
- Pyramid Power
- Cairns City Cobras (Cairns Cities)
- Cassowary Coast Crows

== Notable Players ==
Notable players from the AFL Cairns who went on to play professionally include:

=== AFL Players ===
- Colin Judd (Hawthorn)
- Alex Davies (Manunda Hawks) (Gold Coast)
- Craig Brittain(North Melbourne)
- Troy Clarke (Brisbane Bears)
- Mark West (Western Bulldogs)
- Charlie Dixon (Cairns Saints) (Port Adelaide / Gold Coast)
- Rex Liddy (North Cairns) (Gold Coast)
- Che Cockatoo-Collins (City United)
- Donald Cockatoo-Collins
- David Cockatoo-Collins
- Jason Roe (Cairns City Cobras) (Brisbane Lions)
- Peter Yagmoor (Cairns City Cobras/Lions) (Collingwood)
- Courtenay Dempsey (Manunda Hawks) (Essendon)
- Jarrod Harbrow (Manunda Hawks) (Gold Coast)
- Sam Michael (Manunda Hawks) (Brisbane Lions / Essendon)
- Jack Bowes (Cairns Saints) (Gold Coast)
- Jacob Heron (Cairns Saints) (Gold Coast)

=== AFLW Players ===
- Poppy Boltz - Cairns Saints
- Jacqui Dupuy - Cairns Saints
- Heidi Talbot - North Cairns
- Greta Bodey - Cairns Saints (Brisbane / Hawthorn)
- Elisha King - North Cairns (North Melbourne)
- Breanna Koenen - North Cairns (Brisbane)
- Leah Kaslar - Centrals Trinity Beach (Brisbane / Gold Coast)
- Tiarna Ernst - Manunda (Western Bulldogs / Gold Coast)

== Grounds/Venues ==
- Port Douglas Sporting Complex - Port Douglas Crocs
- Fretwell Park - South Cairns Cutters
- Cazalys Stadium (Formerly known as Australian Football Park (AFP) - Manunda Hawks
- Watsons Oval - North Cairns Tigers
- Crathern Park - Centrals Bulldogs
- Holloways Beach Sporting Complex - Cairns City Lions
- Griffiths Park (Formerly known as Cairns Cricketers Club / Sportsworld) - Cairns Saints
- Maher Road Oval (Formerly Power Park) - Pyramid Power / Gordonvale Suns
- Redlynch State College Oval
- Buchan Street - Cape York Eagles

=== Former Grounds/Venues ===
- Cairns Showgrounds Oval - City United / Manunda
- Balaclava State School Oval - Souths Balaclava
- Babinda Showgrounds Oval - Babinda Magpies

== 2009 Ladder ==
AFL Cairns	Wins	Byes	Losses	Draws	For	Against	%	Pts	Final	Team	G	B	Pts	Team	G	B	Pts
South Cairns	17	0	1	0	2363	1241	190.41%	68	1st Semi	Cairns Saints	20	11	131	Manunda Hawks	17	12	114
Centrals Trinity Beach	14	0	4	0	2306	1347	171.20%	56	2nd Semi	South Cairns	16	15	111	Centrals Trinity Beach	16	10	106
Cairns Saints	11	0	7	0	2152	1566	137.42%	44	Preliminary	Cairns Saints	20	15	135	Centrals Trinity Beach	11	5	71
Manunda Hawks	10	0	8	0	1903	2093	90.92%	40	Grand	Cairns Saints	16	8	104	South Cairns	12	9	81
Port Douglas	4	0	14	0	1471	2406	61.14%	16									
Cairns City Cobras	4	0	14	0	1185	2045	57.95%	16									
North Cairns	3	0	15	0	1424	2106	67.62%	12									

== 2010 Ladder ==
AFL Cairns	Wins	Byes	Losses	Draws	For	Against	%	Pts	Final	Team	G	B	Pts	Team	G	B	Pts
Port Douglas	18	0	0	0	2826	1155	244.68%	72	1st Semi	Centrals Trinity Beach	13	14	92	Manunda Hawks	9	16	70
Cairns Saints	12	0	6	0	2131	1453	146.66%	48	2nd Semi	Cairns Saints	12	12	84	Port Douglas	10	11	71
Manunda Hawks	10	0	8	0	1982	1838	107.83%	40	Preliminary	Port Douglas	16	25	121	Centrals Trinity Beach	4	6	30
Centrals Trinity Beach	9	0	9	0	1701	1899	89.57%	36	Grand	Cairns Saints	17	16	118	Port Douglas	12	8	80
North Cairns	7	0	11	0	1750	1902	92.01%	28									
Cairns City Cobras	6	0	12	0	1434	1992	71.99%	24									
South Cairns	1	0	17	0	1136	2721	41.75%	4									

== 2011 Ladder ==
AFL Cairns	Wins	Byes	Losses	Draws	For	Against	%	Pts	Final	Team	G	B	Pts	Team	G	B	Pts
Manunda Hawks	16	3	2	0	2381	1366	174.30%	76	1st Semi	Port Douglas	15	16	106	Centrals Trinity Beach	9	8	62
Cairns Saints	15	3	3	0	2367	1383	171.15%	72	2nd Semi	Cairns Saints	23	16	154	Manunda Hawks	9	8	62
Port Douglas	14	3	4	0	2337	1474	158.55%	68	Preliminary	Manunda Hawks	14	11	95	Port Douglas	13	8	86
Centrals Trinity Beach	8	3	10	0	1817	1726	105.27%	44	Grand	Manunda Hawks	14	9	93	Cairns Saints	8	10	58
North Cairns	6	3	12	0	1617	2300	70.30%	36									
South Cairns	4	3	14	0	1654	1999	82.74%	28									
Cairns City Lions	0	3	18	0	956	2881	33.18%	12									

== 2012 Ladder ==
AFL Cairns	Wins	Byes	Losses	Draws	For	Against	%	Pts	Final	Team	G	B	Pts	Team	G	B	Pts
Cairns Saints	17	3	1	0	3197	976	327.56%	80	1st Semi	Manunda Hawks	21	13	139	South Cairns	9	8	62
North Cairns	13	3	5	0	2072	1463	141.63%	64	2nd Semi	Cairns Saints	31	11	197	North Cairns	6	12	48
Manunda Hawks	11	3	7	0	1796	1711	104.97%	56	Preliminary	Manunda Hawks	18	11	119	North Cairns	13	11	89
South Cairns	9	3	9	0	1691	2042	82.81%	48	Grand	Cairns Saints	24	10	154	Manunda Hawks	16	9	105
Port Douglas	8	3	10	0	1785	1897	94.10%	44									
Centrals Trinity Beach	3	3	15	0	1091	2651	41.15%	24									
Cairns City Lions	2	3	16	0	1567	2459	63.73%	20									

== 2013 Ladder ==
AFL Cairns	Wins	Byes	Losses	Draws	For	Against	%	Pts	Final	Team	G	B	Pts	Team	G	B	Pts
North Cairns	16	3	2	0	2460	1157	212.62%	76	1st Semi	Port Douglas	11	18	84	South Cairns	8	11	59
Cairns Saints	15	3	3	0	2354	1247	188.77%	72	2nd Semi	Cairns Saints	8	14	62	North Cairns	7	10	52
Port Douglas	13	3	5	0	2106	1413	149.04%	64	Preliminary	North Cairns	21	8	134	Port Douglas	9	16	70
South Cairns	7	3	11	0	1659	2017	82.25%	40	Grand	Cairns Saints	17	7	109	North Cairns	11	19	85
Manunda Hawks	5	3	13	0	1470	1885	77.98%	32									
Centrals Trinity Beach	5	3	13	0	1221	2305	52.97%	32									
Cairns City Lions	2	3	16	0	1408	2654	53.05%	20									

== 2014 Ladder ==
AFL Cairns	Wins	Byes	Losses	Draws	For	Against	%	Pts	Final	Team	G	B	Pts	Team	G	B	Pts
South Cairns	15	3	2	1	1963	1084	181.09%	74	1st Semi	Port Douglas	17	16	118	North Cairns	11	6	72
Cairns Saints	14	3	3	1	1998	1101	181.47%	70	2nd Semi	Cairns Saints	18	6	114	South Cairns	11	6	72
Port Douglas	12	3	5	1	2069	1176	175.94%	62	Preliminary	Port Douglas	12	11	83	South Cairns	10	4	64
North Cairns	7	3	10	1	1253	1633	76.73%	42	Grand	Port Douglas	15	10	100	Cairns Saints	13	6	84
Cairns City Lions	6	3	12	0	1684	2059	81.79%	36									
Manunda Hawks	4	3	13	1	987	1699	58.09%	30									
Centrals Trinity Beach	2	3	15	1	1087	2300	47.26%	22									

== 2015 Ladder ==
AFL Cairns	Wins	Byes	Losses	Draws	For	Against	%	Pts	Final	Team	G	B	Pts	Team	G	B	Pts
Port Douglas	16	0	2	0	2014	1083	185.96%	64	1st Semi	Cairns Saints	14	15	99	Centrals Trinity Beach	6	12	48
South Cairns	12	0	6	0	1921	1202	159.82%	48	2nd Semi	South Cairns	14	11	95	Port Douglas	11	14	80
Cairns Saints	11	0	7	0	1917	1236	155.10%	44	Preliminary	Cairns Saints	14	11	95	Port Douglas	11	14	80
Centrals Trinity Beach	9	0	9	0	1659	1482	111.94%	36	Grand	Cairns Saints	14	12	96	South Cairns	13	9	87
Cairns City Lions	5	0	13	0	1459	2000	72.95%	20									
North Cairns	1	0	17	0	881	2848	30.93%	4									

== 2016 Ladder ==
AFL Cairns	Wins	Byes	Losses	Draws	For	Against	%	Pts	Final	Team	G	B	Pts	Team	G	B	Pts
Port Douglas	17	3	1	0	2265	841	269.32%	80	1st Semi	Centrals Trinity Beach	13	10	88	Cairns Saints	13	7	85
South Cairns	15	3	3	0	2086	1281	162.84%	72	2nd Semi	South Cairns	13	9	87	Port Douglas	7	13	55
Centrals Trinity Beach	10	3	8	0	1768	1498	118.02%	52	Preliminary	Port Douglas	24	13	157	Centrals Trinity Beach	4	4	28
Cairns Saints	10	3	8	0	1586	1368	115.94%	52	Grand	Port Douglas	17	15	117	South Cairns	14	7	91
Cairns City Lions	6	3	12	0	1306	1817	71.88%	36									
Manunda Hawks	5	3	13	0	1264	1701	74.31%	32									
North Cairns	0	3	18	0	825	2594	31.80%	12									

== 2017 Ladder ==
AFL Cairns	Wins	Byes	Losses	Draws	For	Against	%	Pts	Final	Team	G	B	Pts	Team	G	B	Pts
Port Douglas	18	3	0	0	3041	788	385.91%	84	1st Semi	Manunda Hawks	14	14	98	South Cairns	13	11	89
Centrals Trinity Beach	12	3	6	0	2369	1204	196.76%	60	2nd Semi	Port Douglas	11	18	84	Centrals Trinity Beach	8	6	54
South Cairns	11	3	7	0	2007	1270	158.03%	56	Preliminary	Manunda Hawks	15	13	103	Centrals Trinity Beach	9	16	70
Manunda Hawks	11	3	7	0	2095	1469	142.61%	56	Grand	Port Douglas	21	19	145	Manunda	11	4	70
Cairns Saints	8	3	10	0	1721	1653	104.11%	44									
North Cairns	3	3	15	0	1010	2322	43.50%	24									
Cairns City Lions	0	3	18	0	340	3877	8.77%	12									

== 2018 Ladder ==
AFL Cairns	Wins	Byes	Losses	Draws	For	Against	%	Pts	Final	Team	G	B	Pts	Team	G	B	Pts
Port Douglas	17	3	1	0	2736	949	288.30%	80	1st Semi	South Cairns	15	8	98	Centrals Trinity Beach	9	14	68
Cairns Saints	16	3	2	0	2350	988	237.85%	76	2nd Semi	Port Douglas	17	7	109	Cairns Saints	10	10	70
South Cairns	10	3	8	0	1944	1422	136.71%	52	Preliminary	Cairns Saints	11	12	78	South Cairns	6	7	43
Centrals Trinity Beach	8	3	10	0	1563	1710	91.40%	44	Grand	Port Douglas	12	17	89	Cairns Saints	6	7	43
Manunda Hawks	7	3	11	0	1478	1559	94.80%	40									
Cairns City Lions	3	3	15	0	950	2697	35.22%	24									
North Cairns	2	3	16	0	884	2580	34.26	20									

== 2019 Ladder ==
AFL Cairns	Wins	Byes	Losses	Draws	For	Against	%	Pts	Final	Team	G	B	Pts	Team	G	B	Pts
Port Douglas	14	3	2	0	2660	652	407.98%	68	1st Semi	Manunda Hawks	12	12	84	Cairns City Lions	10	8	68
South Cairns	14	3	2	0	2084	882	236.28%	68	2nd Semi	Port Douglas	18	13	121	South Cairns	9	12	66
Cairns City Lions	8	3	8	0	1552	1384	112.16%	64	Preliminary	South Cairns	12	15	87	Manunda Hawks	3	9	27
Manunda Hawks	7	3	9	0	1410	1393	101.22%	40	Grand	Port Douglas	15	9	99	South Cairns	9	11	65
Cairns Saints	7	3	9	0	1172	1361	86.11%	40									
Centrals Trinity Beach	6	3	10	0	1338	1517	88.20%	36									
North Cairns	0	3	16	0	303	3330	9.10%	12									

== 2020 Ladder ==
AFL Cairns	Wins	Byes	Losses	Draws	For	Against	%	Pts	Final	Team	G	B	Pts	Team	G	B	Pts
Port Douglas	12	2	0	0	1688	397	425.19%	56	1st Semi	South Cairns	12	9	81	Cairns City Lions	12	7	79
Cairns Saints	9	2	3	0	1110	716	155.03%	44	2nd Semi	Port Douglas	18	16	124	Cairns Saints	4	4	28
South Cairns	7	2	5	0	1259	692	181.94%	36	Preliminary	Cairns Saints	13	6	84	South Cairns	6	10	46
Cairns City Lions	7	2	5	0	1157	723	160.03%	36	Grand	Port Douglas	15	12	102	Cairns Saints	11	6	72
Centrals Trinity Beach	4	2	8	0	661	1231	53.70%	24									
Manunda Hawks	3	2	9	0	578	1083	53.37%	20									
North Cairns	0	2	12	0	340	1951	17.43%	8									

== Premiers ==
Below is the complete list of senior premiers in the AFL Cairns:

- 1956 South Cairns
- 1957 Tinaroo Falls
- 1958 North Cairns
- 1959 North Cairns
- 1960 Aloomba
- 1961 Babinda
- 1962 Babinda
- 1963 Souths/Balaclava
- 1964 Souths/Balaclava
- 1965 Souths/Balaclava
- 1966 Souths/Balaclava
- 1967 Centrals/Aloomba
- 1968 Souths/Balaclava
- 1969 Centrals/Aloomba
- 1970 Babinda
- 1971 Souths/Balaclava
- 1972 Souths/Balaclava
- 1973 Centrals/Aloomba
- 1974 Centrals/Aloomba
- 1975 Centrals/Aloomba
- 1976 North Cairns
- 1977 North Cairns
- 1978 Centrals/Aloomba
- 1979 Centrals/Aloomba
- 1980 North Cairns
- 1981 North Cairns
- 1982 City United
- 1983 City United
- 1984 North Cairns
- 1985 North Cairns
- 1986 North Cairns
- 1987 Manunda Hawks
- 1988 North Cairns
- 1989 Centrals/Trinity Beach
- 1990 Centrals/Trinity Beach
- 1991 Port Douglas
- 1992 Centrals/Trinity Beach
- 1993 Centrals/Trinity Beach
- 1994 Cairns Saints
- 1995 Cairns Saints
- 1996 Cairns Saints
- 1997 Centrals/Trinity Beach
- 1998 Cairns Saints
- 1999 Cairns Saints
- 2000 Cairns Saints
- 2001 Port Douglas
- 2002 Cairns Saints
- 2003 South Cairns
- 2004 Title withheld due to brawl
- 2005 Port Douglas
- 2006 Manunda Hawks
- 2007 Manunda Hawks
- 2008 Cairns Saints
- 2009 Cairns Saints
- 2010 Cairns Saints
- 2011 Manunda Hawks
- 2012 Cairns Saints
- 2013 Cairns Saints
- 2014 Port Douglas
- 2015 Cairns Saints
- 2016 Port Douglas
- 2017 Port Douglas
- 2018 Port Douglas
- 2019 Port Douglas
- 2020 Port Douglas
- 2021 Cairns City Lions
- 2022 Cairns City Lions
- 2023 Port Douglas
- 2024 South Cairns
- 2025 North Cairns
- 2026 Port Douglas

== Senior Grand Final Results ==
Year	Winning Club	Score	Losing Club	Score
1956	South Cairns	10.6 (66)	North Cairns	7.7 (49)
1957	Tinaroo Falls	10.12 (72)	Innisfail Roos	6.9 (45)
1958	North Cairns	N/A	South Cairns	N/A
1959	North Cairns	N/A	Centrals	N/A
1960	Aloomba Gordonvale	N/A	Centrals	N/A
1961	Babinda Magpies	N/A	Souths Balaclava	N/A
1962	Babinda Magpies	N/A	Souths Balaclava	N/A
1963	Souths Balaclava	11.11 (77)	Babinda Magpies	10.7 (67)
1964	Souths Balaclava	17.8 (110)	Centrals	8.13 (61)
1965	Souths Balaclava	11.16 (82)	Babinda	8.9 (57)
1966	Souths Balaclava	8.15 (63)	Centrals Aloomba	8.9 (57)
1967	Centrals Aloomba	N/A	Souths Balaclava	N/A
1968	Souths Balaclava	N/A	North Cairns	N/A
1969	Centrals Aloomba	10.11 (71)	Souths Balaclava	8.10 (58)
1970	Babinda	13.6 (84)	Souths Balaclava	11.15 (81)
1971	Souths Balaclava	N/A	North Cairns	N/A
1972	Souths Balaclava	defeated	Centrals Aloomba	Score N/A
1973	Centrals Aloomba	11.11 (77)	North Cairns	10-13 (73)
1974	Centrals Aloomba	N/A	North Cairns	N/A
1975	Centrals Aloomba	N/A	City United	N/A
1976	North Cairns	N/A	City United	N/A
1977	North Cairns	N/A	N/A	N/A
1978	Centrals Aloomba	N/A	N/A	N/A
1979	Centrals Aloomba	N/A	N/A	N/A
1980	North Cairns	19.16 (130)	Centrals Aloomba	9.9 (63)
1981	North Cairns	20.20 (140)	Souths Balaclava	13.9 (87)
1982	City United	N/A	N/A	N/A
1983	City United	N/A	N/A	N/A
1984	North Cairns	N/A	N/A	N/A
1985	North Cairns	14.14 (98)	Souths Balaclava	11.8 (74)
1986	North Cairns	13.12 (90)	Centrals Aloomba	11.8 (74)
1987	Manunda Hawks	14.12 (96)	Centrals Aloomba	14.10 (94)
1988	North Cairns	17.13 (115)	Centrals Aloomba	11.11 (77)
1989	Centrals Trinity Beach	22.23 (155)	North Cairns	13.6 (84)
1990	Centrals Trinity Beach	23.16 (154)	Port Douglas	7.12 (54)
1991	Port Douglas	N/a	City's Cobras	N/A
1992	Centrals Trinity Beach	N/A	City's Cobras	N/A
1993	Centrals Trinity Beach	N/A	Cairns Saints	N/A
1994	Cairns Saints	N/A	City's Cobras	N/A
1995	Cairns Saints	6.7 (43)	Centrals Trinity Beach	12.14 (86)
1996	Cairns Saints	N/A	Centrals Trinity Beach	N/A
1997	Centrals Trinity Beach	20.10 (130)	Port Douglas	5.9 (39)
1998	Cairns Saints	9.11 (65)	Centrals Trinity Beach	9.5 (59)
1999	Cairns Saints	19.18 (132)	Port Douglas	9.5 (59)
2000	Cairns Saints	15.10 (100)	Centrals Trinity Beach	3.7 (25)
2001	Port Douglas	7.8 (50)	South Cairns	5.16 (46)
2002	Cairns Saints	17.3 (105)	South Cairns	9.15 (69)
2003	South Cairns	11.16 (82)	North Cairns	6.10 (46)
2004^{1}	North Cairns	16.10 (106)	Port Douglas	8.10 (58)
2005	Port Douglas	11.10 (76)	South Cairns	11.9 (75)
2006	Manunda Hawks	18.11 (119)	South Cairns	8.8 (56)
2007	Manunda Hawks	18.7 (115)	Cairns Saints	13.16 (94)
2008	Cairns Saints	14.19 (103)	South Cairns	5.16 (46)
2009	Cairns Saints	16.8 (104)	South Cairns	12.9 (81)
2010	Cairns Saints	17.16 (118)	Port Douglas	12.8 (80)
2011	Manunda Hawks	14.9 (93)	Cairns Saints	8.10 (58)
2012	Cairns Saints	24.10 (154)	Manunda Hawks	16.9 (105)
2013	Cairns Saints	17.7 (109)	North Cairns	11.19 (85)
2014	Port Douglas	15.10 (100)	Cairns Saints	13. 6 (84)
2015	Cairns Saints	14.12 (96)	South Cairns	13.9 (87)
2016	Port Douglas	17.13 (115)	Souths Cairns	14.7 (91)
2017	Port Douglas	21.19 (145)	Manunda Hawks	11.4 (70)
2018	Port Douglas	12.17 (89)	Cairns Saints	6.7 (43)
2019	Port Douglas	15.9 (99)	South Cairns	9.11 (65)
2020	Port Douglas	15.12 (102)	Cairns Saints	11.6 (72)
2021	Cairns City Lions	15.12 (102)	Cairns Saints	14.7 (91)
2022	Cairns City Lions	21.12 (138)	Port Douglas	6.7 (43)
2023	Port Douglas	12.7 (79)	Cairns Saints	6.9 (45)
2024	South Cairns	16.17 (113)	North Cairns	12.9 (81)
2025	North Cairns	12.12 (84)	Centrals-Trinity Beach	7.14 (56)

^{1} The 2004 Senior Grade Grand Final was declared a "no result" and the Premiership Cup withheld.

=== Senior Premierships Summary List 1956–2025 ===
Club	Premiers
Cairns Saints	13
Centrals Trinity Beach (Formerly Centrals Aloomba)	12
North Cairns	11
South Cairns (Formerly Souths Balaclava & Aloomba Gordonvale)	11
Port Douglas	11
Manunda	4
Cairns City Lions (Formerly City United/Cobras)	4
Babinda Magpies	3
Tinnaroo Falls	1

== Senior Womens Grand Final Results ==
Year	Winning Club	Score	Losing Club	Score
2023				
2024				
2025				
2026	North Cairns	7.3 (45)	Centrals Trinity Beach	0.6 (6)

=== Womens Premierships Summary List ===
Club	Premiers
Centrals Trinity Beach	
North Cairns	
Port Douglas	
Cairns City Lions	
South Cairns	
Cairns Saints	
Manunda	

== Recent Reserve Grade Grand Final Results ==
Year	Premiers	Score	Runners Up	Score
2000	Centrals-Trinity Beach	5.6 (36)	Cairns Saints	5.4 (34)
2001	Centrals-Trinity Beach	12.9 (81)	South Cairns	1.6 (12)
2002	Port Douglas	12.11 (83)	South Cairns	5.7 (37)
2003	Centrals-Trinity Beach	14.11 (95)	North Cairns	6.7 (43)
2004	Port Douglas	17.13 (115)	North Cairns	8.9 (57)
2005	Port Douglas	19.14 (128)	Cairns Saints	4.11 (35)
2006	Manunda Hawks	11.11 (77)	Centrals-Trinity Beach	10.9 (69)
2007	Centrals-Trinity Beach	14.16 (100)	Cairns Saints	11.2 (68)
2008	Cairns Saints	12.15 (87)	North Cairns	2.9 (21)
2009	South Cairns	9.11 (65)	Cairns Saints	9.4 (58)
2010	North Cairns	8.10 (58)	Port Douglas	8.5 (53)
2011	Manunda Hawks	11.8 (74)	Port Douglas	6.9 (45)
2012	Cairns Saints	17.6 (108)	North Cairns	11.12 (78)
2013	North Cairns	14.14 (98)	Port Douglas	13.6 (84)
2014	Port Douglas	18.14 (122)	Cairns Saints	5.4 (34)
2015	Centrals-Trinity Beach	9.7 (61)	Port Douglas	6.10 (46)
2016	South Cairns	11.9 (75)	Port Douglas	11.4 (70)
2017	Port Douglas	13.10 (88)	South Cairns	14.3 (87)
2018	Pyramid Power	12.12 (84)	Port Douglas	10.7 (67)
2019	South Cairns	12.11 (83)	Manunda Hawks	8.5 (53)
2020	Port Douglas	22.11 (143)	South Cairns	2.4 (16)
2021	South Cairns	8.3 (51)	Cairns Saints	7.7 (49)
2022	Centrals-Trinity Beach	8.14 (62)	Cairns Saints	3.7 (25)
2023	Centrals-Trinity Beach	7.13 (55)	South Cairns	4.7 (31)
2024	South Cairns	8.9 (57)	Cairns Saints	5.10 (40)
2025	Cairns Saints	9.4 (58)	Centrals-Trinity Beach	4.11 (35)

=== Reserves Premierships Summary List 1962-2025 ===
Club	Premiers
Centrals Trinity Beach (Formerly Centrals Aloomba)	14
North Cairns	12
Port Douglas	8
Cairns City Lions (Formerly City United/Cobras)	6
Babinda Magpies	6
South Cairns (Formerly Souths Balaclava)	7
Cairns Saints	4
Manunda	3
Westcourt Demons	2
Mareeba Saints	1
Pyramid Power	1

== League Best & Fairest Medalists ==
=== Crathern Medalists (Senior Men's Best & Fairest Medal Winners) ===
- 2025 -
- 2024 -
- 2023 -
- 2022 -
- 2021 -
- 2020 -
- 2019 -
- 2018 -
- 2017 -
- 2016 -
- 2015 -

=== Jo Butland Medalists (Senior Womens Best & Fairest Medal Winners) ===
- 2024 - Hannah Hillman (North Cairns Tigers)
- 2023 - Jennifer Wren (Manunda Hawks)
- 2022 - Tiarna Ahwang (Cairns Saints)
- 2021 - Poppy Boltz (Cairns Saints)
- 2020 - Kareena White (Manunda Hawks), Jennifer Robinson (Manunda Hawks) & Laquioya Cockatoo-Motlap (Cairns City Lions)
- 2019 - Tahlia Smith (Cairns Saints)
- 2018 - Kitara Whap-Farrar (South Cairns)
- 2017 - Kitara Whap-Farrar (South Cairns)
- 2016 - Luana Healey (North Cairns)
- 2015 - Selena Goodman (North Cairns)
- 2014 - Selena Goodman (North Cairns)
- 2013 - Selena Goodman (North Cairns)
- 2006/2007 - Jo Butland (North Cairns)
- 2005/2006 - Jo Butland (North Cairns)
- 2004/2005 - Jo Butland (North Cairns)
- 2003/2004 - Jo Butland (North Cairns)

=== Reg Dean Medalists (Reserves Mens Best & Fairest Medal Winners) ===
- 2025 -
- 2024 -
- 2023 -
- 2022 -
- 2021 -
- 2020 -
- 2019 -
- 2018 -
- 2017 -
- 2016 -
- 2015 -

== See also ==
- Australian rules football in Queensland
