= Port Douglas Crocs =

Port Douglas

Names
- Full name: Port Douglas Football Club
- Nickname: Crocs

Club details
- Founded: 1989; 37 years ago
- Colours
- Competition: AFL Cairns
- President: Barry Lea
- Coach: Jared Petrenko
- Premierships: (11): 1991, 2001, 2005, 2014, 2016, 2017, 2018, 2019, 2020, 2023, 2026
- Ground: Port Douglas Sporting Complex

Uniforms
Home

Other information
- Official website: portdouglasafl.com.au

Port Douglas Crocs Australian Football Club is an Australian rules football club based to the north of that region in Port Douglas, Queensland and is the club sited furthest north on the east coast of Australia.

The football team currently plays in the AFL Cairns League. Whilst the league is based in Cairns, Queensland, Port Douglas is a popular tourist destination and is close to both the Great Barrier Reef and the Daintree National Park rainforest.

== History ==
The Port Douglas Football Club was established by Ernest Baxter and Andrew Smith in 1989.

A standalone team the Westcourt Demons, acted as the Port Douglas reserves team from 1990 until 1992 playing out of Australian Football Park, Westcourt, before splitting to be rebranded as the Cairns Saints for the 1993 season. From 1993 onwards, Port Douglas has fielded their own Reserves team.

== Home ground ==
Port Douglas Sporting Complex - Wharf Street, Port Douglas

== Honours ==
- AFL Cairns (11): 1991, 2001, 2005, 2014, 2016, 2017, 2018, 2019, 2020, 2023, 2026
  - Reserves premierships (7): 1999, 2001, 2003, 2004, 2005, 2014, 2017, 2020
