= The Gabba =

Sports stadium in Brisbane, Queensland, Australia

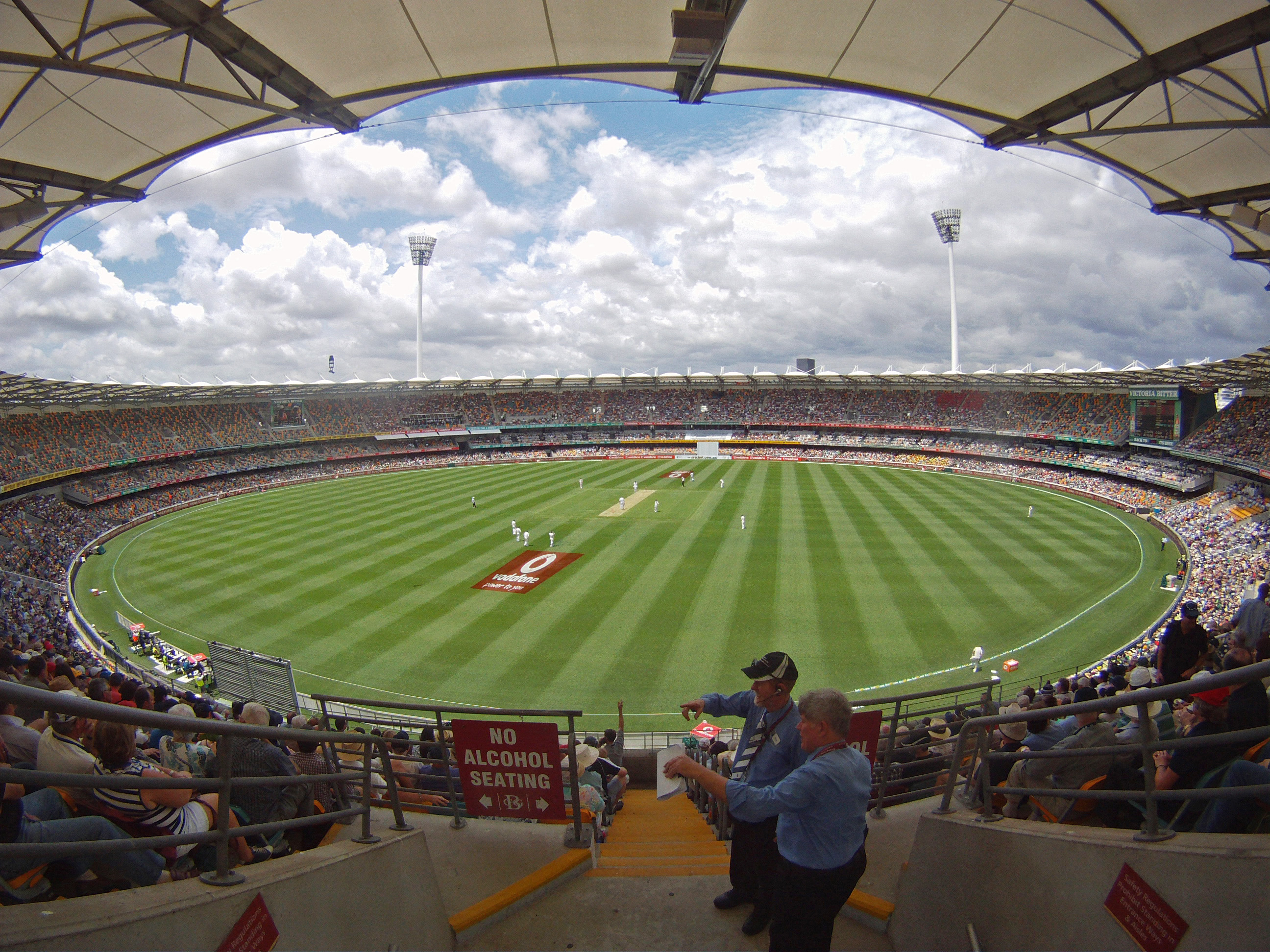
- Stadiums Queensland Rating
- Interactive map of The Gabba

Ground information
- Location: Woolloongabba, Queensland, Australia
- Country: Australia
- Coordinates: 27°29′9″S 153°2′17″E
- Establishment: 1895
- Capacity: 37,000; 37,478 approx (Australian rules football)
- Owner: Queensland Government
- Operator: Stadiums Queensland
- Tenants: Queensland Bulls; Brisbane Lions (AFL); Brisbane Heat (BBL) & (WBBL)
- End names
- Stanley Street End (south); Vulture Street End (north)

International information
- First men's Test: 27 November – 3 December 1931: Australia v South Africa
- Last men's Test: 4–7 December 2025: Australia v England
- First men's ODI: 23 December 1979: England v West Indies
- Last men's ODI: 19 January 2018: Australia v England
- First men's T20I: 9 January 2006: Australia v South Africa
- Last men's T20I: 14 November 2024: Australia v Pakistan
- First women's Test: 1–4 January 1985: Australia v England
- Last women's Test: 15–17 February 2003: Australia v England
- First women's ODI: 16 January 1993: Australia v New Zealand
- Last women's ODI: 17 January 1993: Australia v New Zealand

Team information
Queensland Bulls	(1931–present)
Brisbane Bears (AFL)	(1991, 1993–1996)
Brisbane Lions (AFL)	(1997–present)
Melbourne FC (AFL)	(2001–2007)
Gold Coast Suns (AFL)	(2011, 2018)
Brisbane Heat (BBL)	(2011–present)
Brisbane Heat (WBBL)	(2015–present)
Brisbane Broncos (NRL)	(2023)
Hawthorn Football Club (VFL)	(1981)
- As of 5 January 2025; Source: ESPNcricinfo

The Gabba (officially known as the Brisbane Cricket Ground) is a stadium located in the Brisbane suburb of Woolloongabba in Queensland, Australia. It is primarily used for Australian rules football and cricket as the home ground of the Brisbane Lions in the Australian Football League (AFL), the Brisbane Heat in the Big Bash League (BBL) and the Queensland cricket team in the Sheffield Shield. It also frequently hosts the Australian national cricket team.

Between 1993 and 2005, the Gabba was redeveloped in six stages at a cost of A$128,000,000. The dimensions of the playing field are now 170.6 metres (560 feet) (east-west) by 149.9 metres (492 feet) (north-south), to accommodate the playing of Australian rules football at elite level. The seating capacity of the ground was 42,000 in 2010, which has been reduced in recent times due to new electronic scoreboards and corporate facilities. For international cricket matches, the capacity is reduced to 36,000 due to new scoreboards and the addition of a pool deck, as well as wider sight screens. For AFL matches the capacity is slightly larger at 37,478.

The venue is slated for demolition following the 2032 Summer Olympics, to be succeeded by the future Brisbane Stadium in Victoria Park.

== History ==
=== Foundation ===
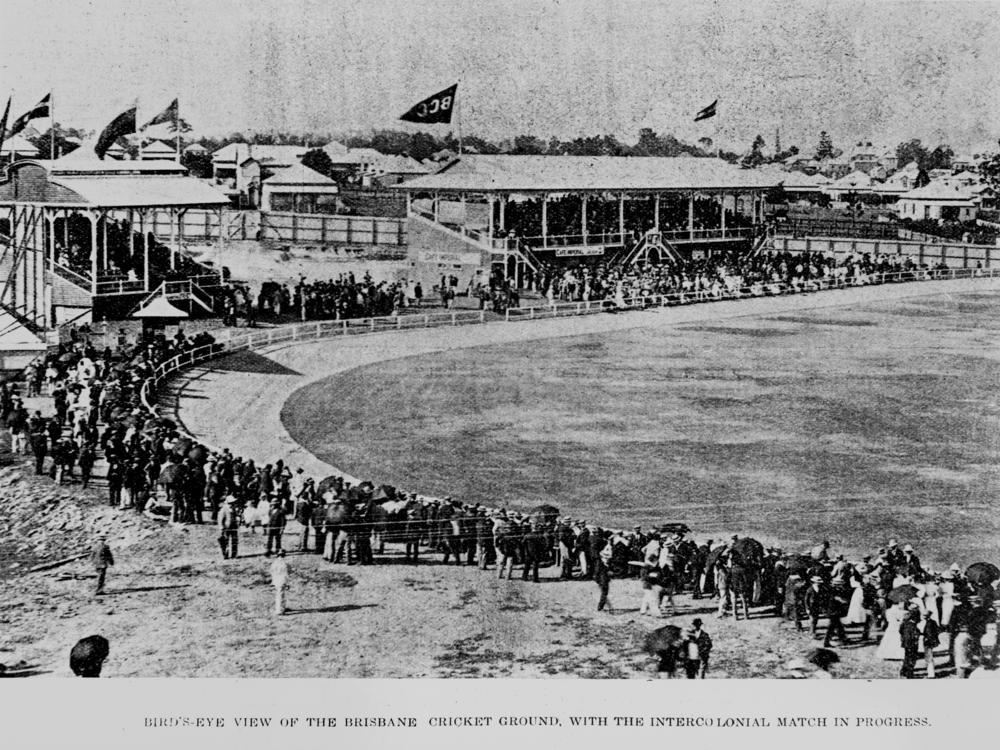
The Gabba in 1899

The land on which the ground sits was set aside for use as a cricket ground in 1895 and the first match was held on the site on 19 December 1896, between Parliament and The Press. Before this, cricket was played at a ground in the area then known as Green Hills (beside Countess Street Petrie Terrace opposite the Victoria Barracks – now occupied by the Northern Busway), since at least the early 1860s.

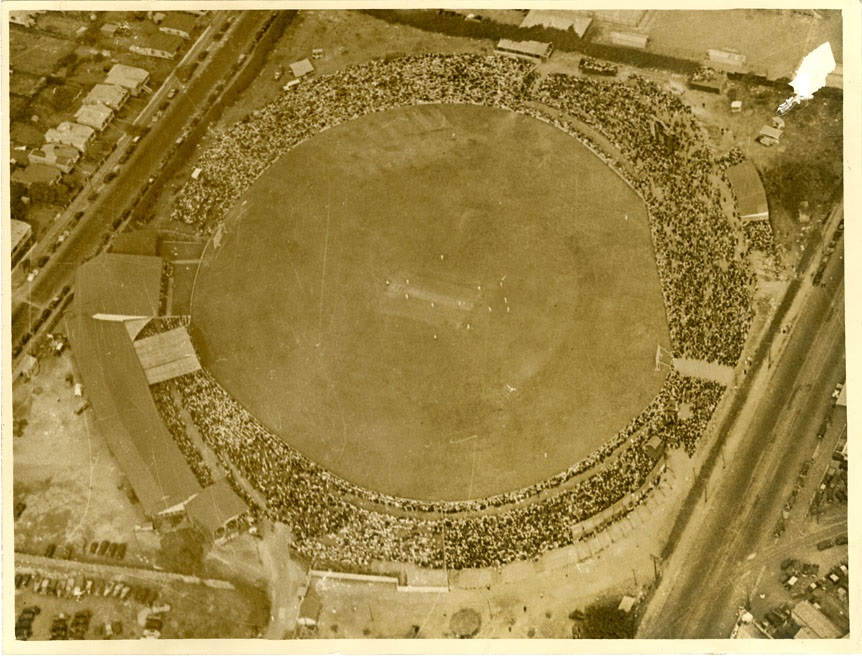
Cricket match, 1936

Greyhound racing meetings were held during 1928 at the ground.

The Gabba shared first-class cricket matches with the Exhibition Ground until 1931. The first Sheffield Shield match at the Gabba was scheduled to be played between 31 January 1931 and 4 February 1931, but it was washed out without a ball being bowled. The first Test match at the Gabba was played between Australia and South Africa between 27 November and 3 December 1931.

In 1972, a greyhound track was installed at The Gabba with night meetings held weekly at the ground for 21 years.

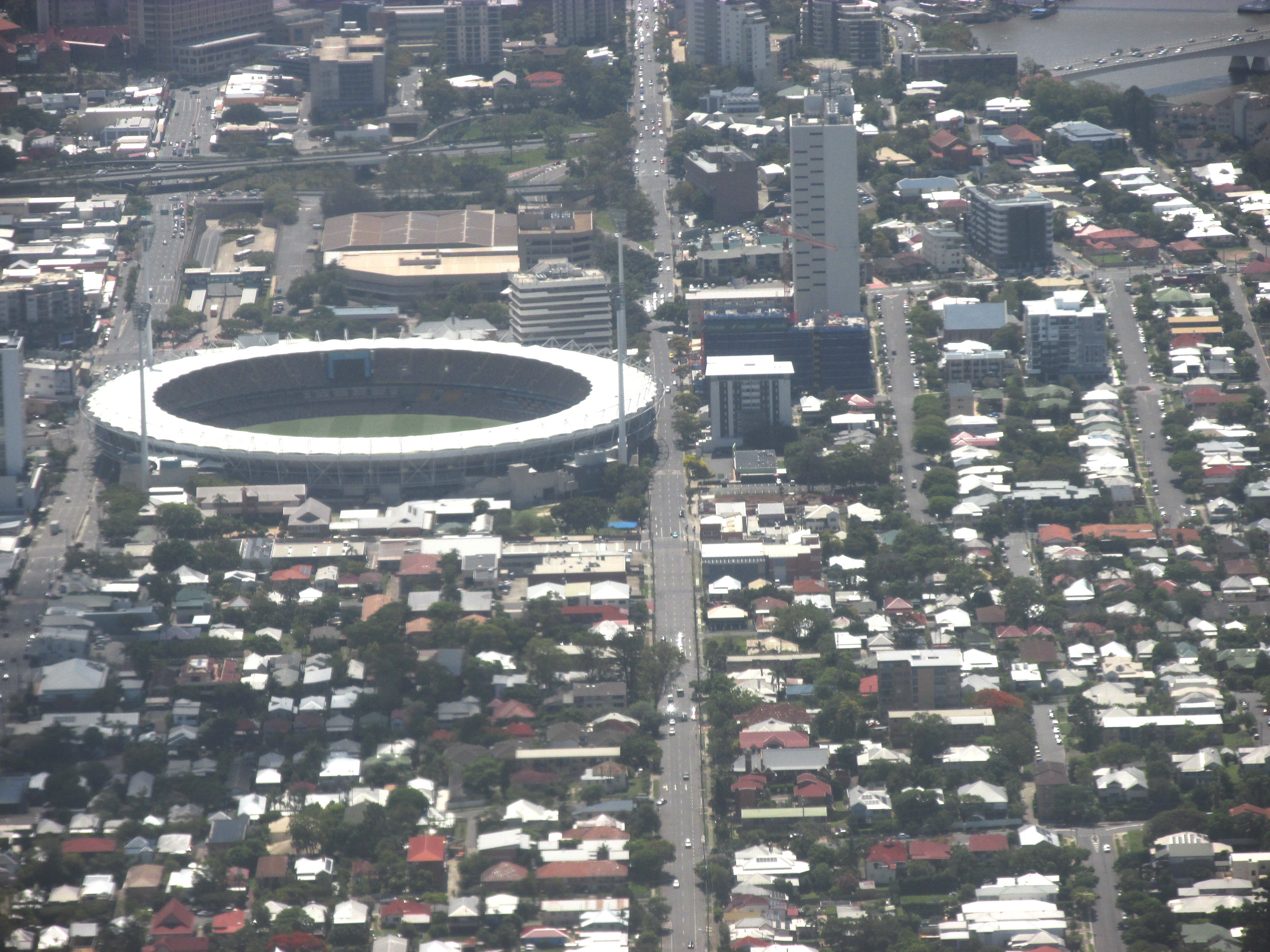
The Gabba overhangs Stanley and Vulture streets (2017)

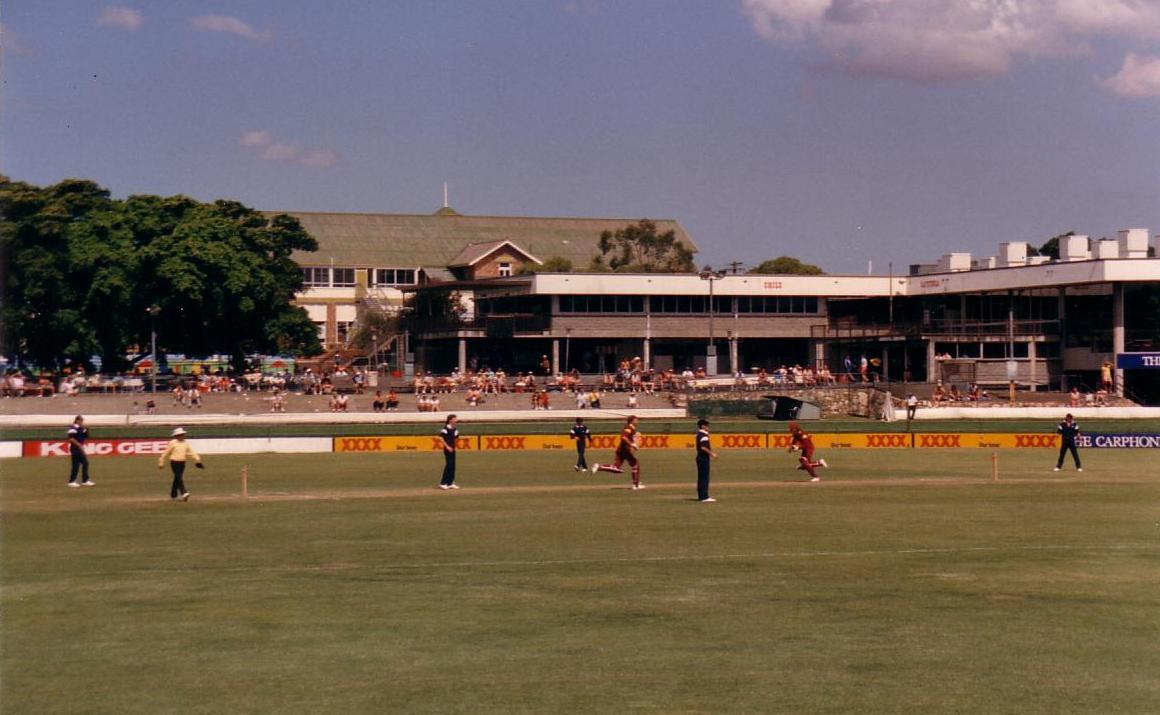
The Gabba in the 1980s prior to redevelopment

=== Expansion ===
From February 1993, work commenced on turning The Gabba into an all-seater stadium. The last greyhound meeting was held at The Gabba on 5 February 1993, with work commencing shortly after to remove the greyhound track around the ground to accommodate the relocation of the Brisbane Bears from Carrara (on the Gold Coast) to The Gabba, renovating the Sir Gordon Chalk Building to house the Bears Social Club and change rooms, refurbishing the Clem Jones stand (named for the long-standing Mayor of Brisbane, Clem Jones), the construction of a new Western grandstand, and extending the playing surface to cater for Australian rules football.The work was largely completed by 11 April when the Bears hosted their first AFL game at the renovated venue against Melbourne in front of 12,821 spectators.

Subsequent further renovations at the ground commencing in 1995 saw the current two tier stands constructed in stages with the last stage completed in 2005 when the Brisbane Lions Social Club (formerly the Brisbane Bears Social Club) was demolished and replaced with a 24 bay grandstand spread over 3 levels of seating with the entire redevelopment costing $AU128 million. Also as part of the redevelopment, five light towers were installed to allow for night football and cricket matches to take place, a light tower at the school end was removed in the late 90s to make way for the expanded grandstands.

The development also resulted in the grandstand structure overhanging Vulture and Stanley streets which tightly constrain the stadium to the north and the south, as well as overhanging the East Brisbane State School in the east. This overhang complicated redevelopment plans and led to speculation that the streets would need to become tunnels in order to facilitate a larger stadium above.

In 2017, the two video screens at the ground were replaced with the new screen at the eastern end in June of that year, followed by the screen at the western end in time for the 2017-18 Ashes series. In mid-2020 the Gabba received a $35 million refurbishment of the stadium's media and corporate facilities, as well as entrances and spectator amenities. The work was completed in October that year, shortly before the venue hosted the 2020 AFL Grand Final.

=== 2032 Summer Olympics and cancelled reconstruction ===
In 2021, when Brisbane was named preferred host of the 2032 Summer Olympics, plans were initially announced for a $1 billion reconstruction of the Gabba to serve as the main stadium. The foundations would have been demolished and rebuilt with new grandstands, expanding it to a capacity of 50,000. By 2023, the projected cost was $2.7 billion, which would be paid entirely by the state. Parallel plans for a 20,000-seat stadium at the Brisbane Showgrounds at a cost of $137 million to be used a temporary venue for the Gabba's tenants during construction were also announced. The cost of the project became controversial.

In March 2024, following an independent review led by former Lord Mayor Graham Quirk, the rebuild project was cancelled, with the Gabba instead slated to undergo a refurbishment ahead of its role in the games, and to no longer serve as the venue for the ceremonies or athletics – with Lang Park and the Queensland Sport and Athletics Centre serving those functions respectively.

In March 2025, after further review and a change of government, it was announced that a new $3.8 billion, 63,000-seat stadium would be constructed in Victoria Park for the Games. Following the conclusion of the Games, the stadium will replace the Gabba as Brisbane's main football and cricket venue. The Gabba will then be demolished, with plans for its site to be redeveloped as a residential development.

== Sports played at the ground ==
=== Cricket ===
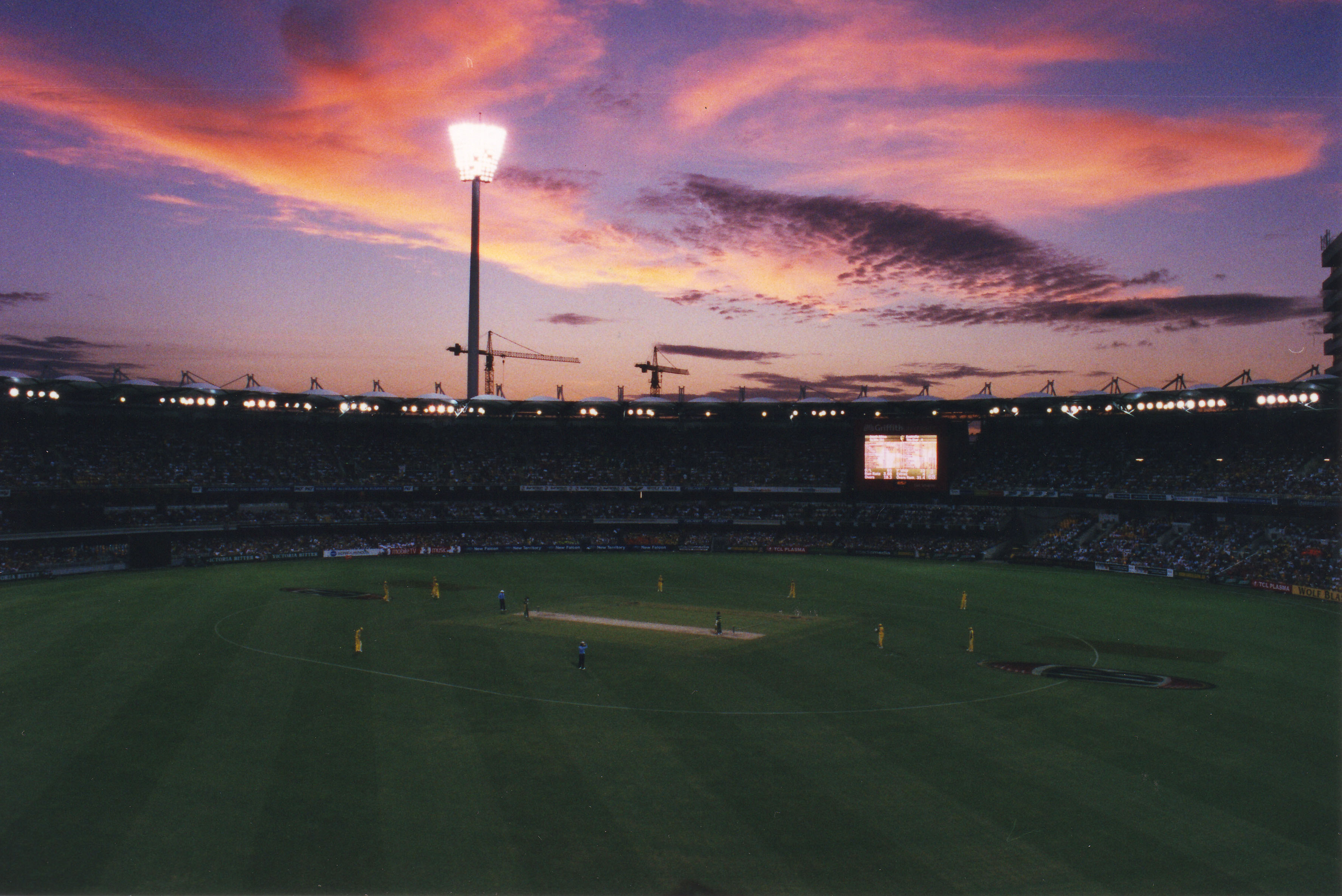
A cricket match between Australia and South Africa, December 2006

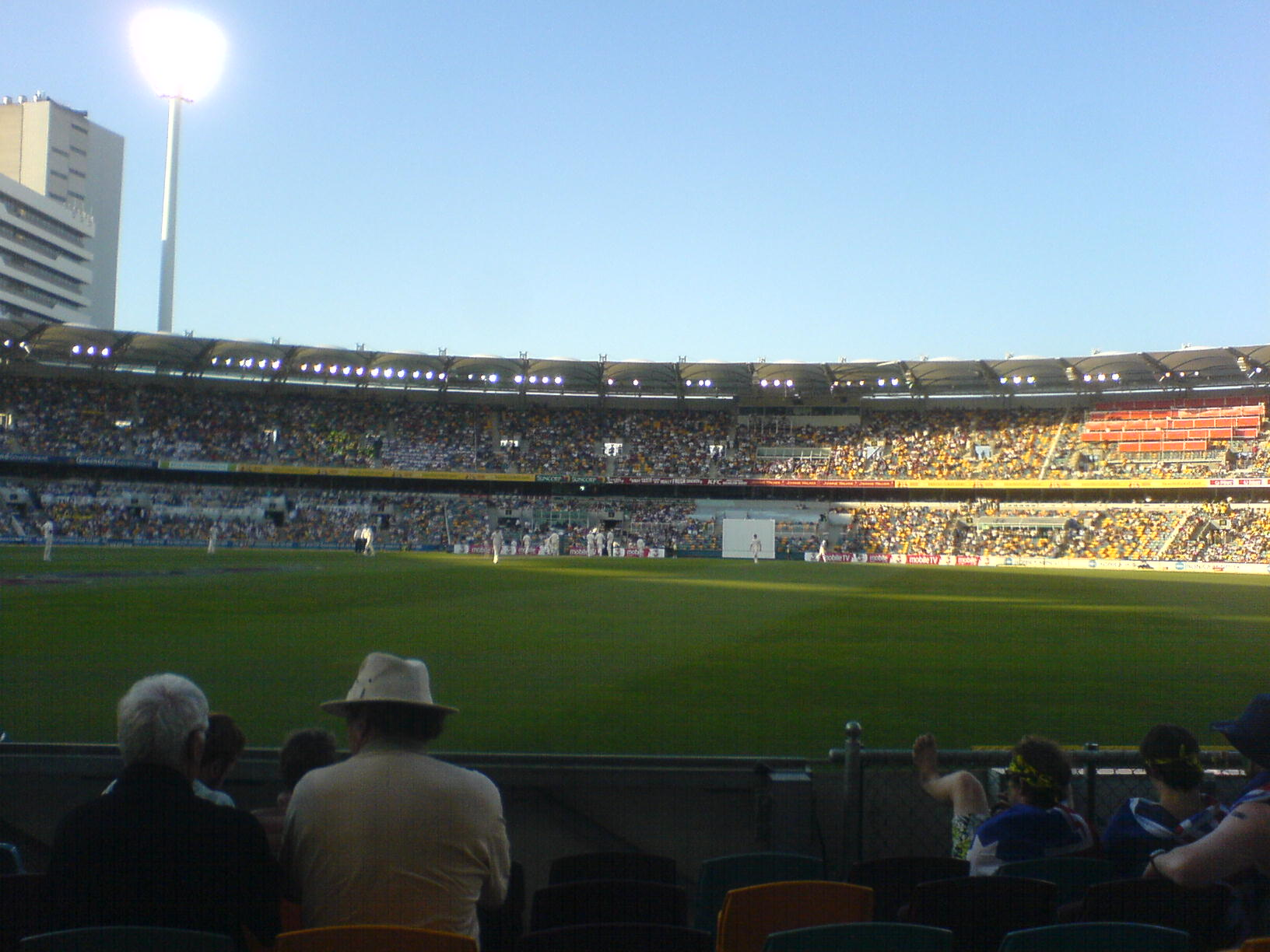
The Gabba in 2006–07 Ashes series

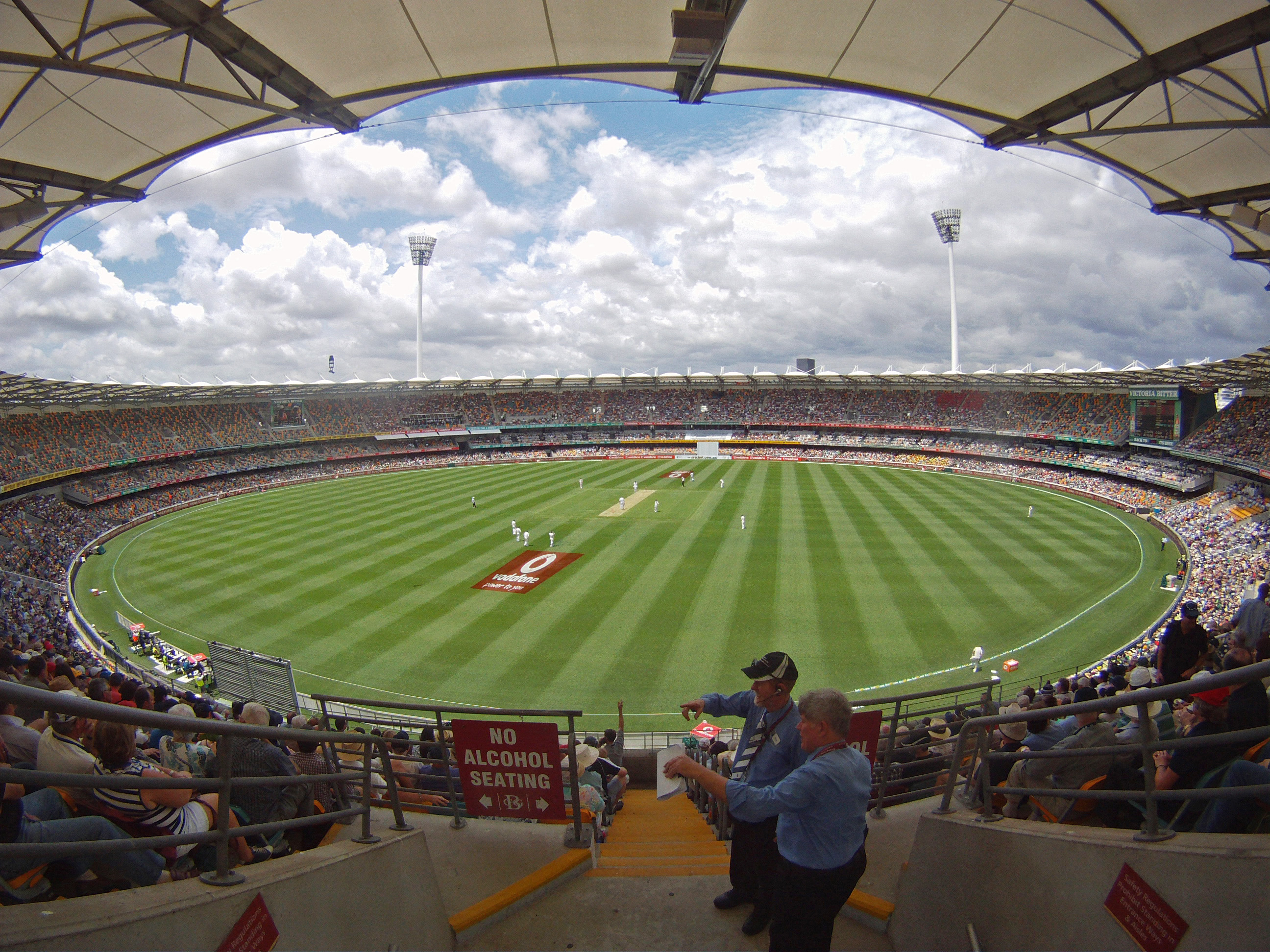
Test match between Australia and South Africa at the Gabba in November 2012

The Gabba's amenities were greatly improved in the 1980s from a very basic standard, especially in comparison with other Australian cricket grounds. Test cricket was first played at the ground in November 1931, when the first test of the series between Australia and South Africa was held there. In December 1960, Cricket's first-ever tied test took place at the ground, when Richie Benaud's Australian team tied with Frank Worrell's West Indian side. Queensland clinched its first-ever Sheffield Shield title with victory over South Australia in the final at the ground in March 1995.

The Gabba was the first Australian venue to host an international Twenty20 cricket match.

As of June 2023, Australia's Michael Clarke holds the record for the highest number of runs scored in one test innings at the Gabba with 259 not out, breaking the previous record set by Alastair Cook.

Australia has a formidable test match record at the ground. As of 2024, in the 66 test matches played there, Australia has won 42, drawn 13, tied 1 and lost 10. Their last loss came in January 2024 against West Indies in the 2nd test of the 2023–24 Frank Worrell trophy. In 2021, India became the first Asian team to win a Test match at the Gabba, after handing Australia their first loss at the Gabba in 29 matches, and 32 years.

On 15 December 2016, Australia hosted Pakistan for the first day-night Test at the Gabba, and the first Australian day-night Test hosted outside the Adelaide Oval.

After Cricket Australia's announcement of test cricket not being played at the ground in the 2026–27 summer of cricket, a deal was landed to hold cricket at the ground 5 years post this break, in the lead up to Brisbane's new cricket venue opening post the 2032 Olympics, Brisbane Olympic Stadium, where it will hold the first test of the 2033–34 Ashes series.

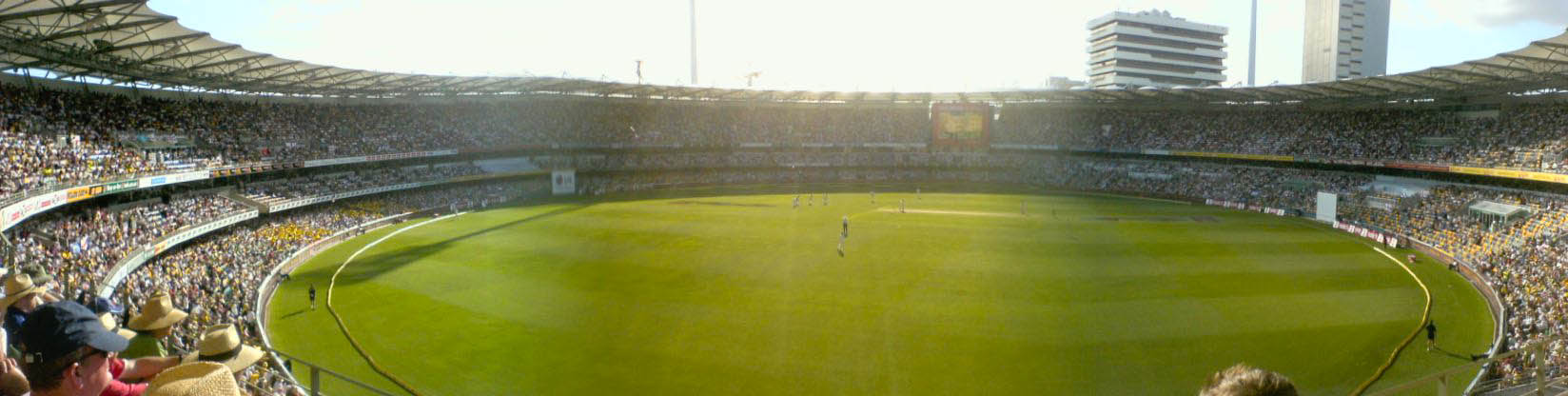
Panorama of the Gabba on the 2nd day of the 2006–07 Ashes series

=== Australian rules football ===
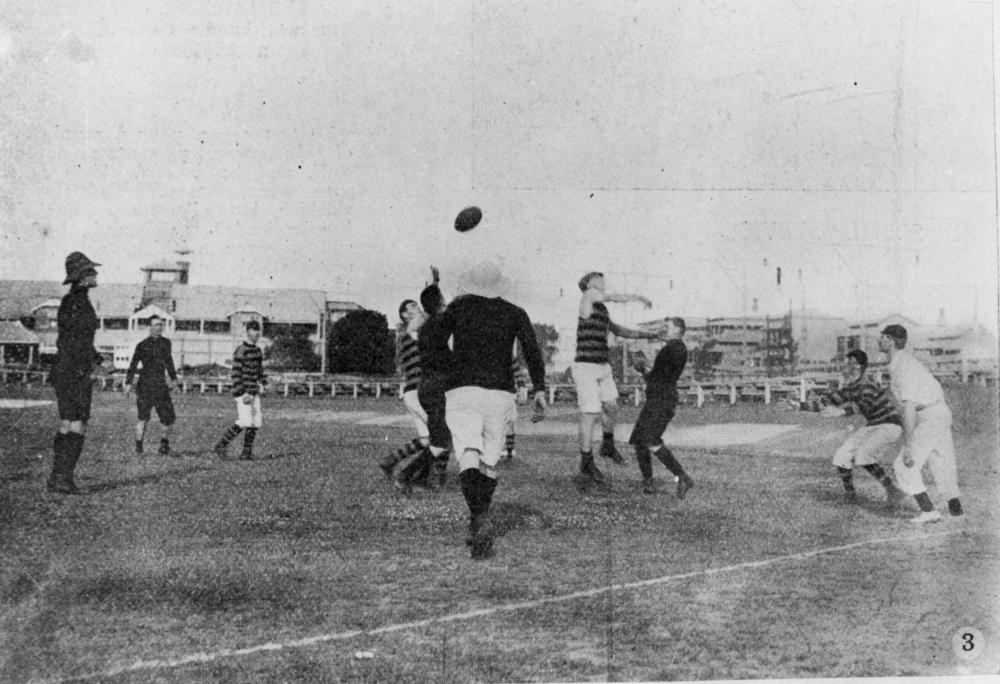
Australian Football Premiership Finals at the Gabba, 1907

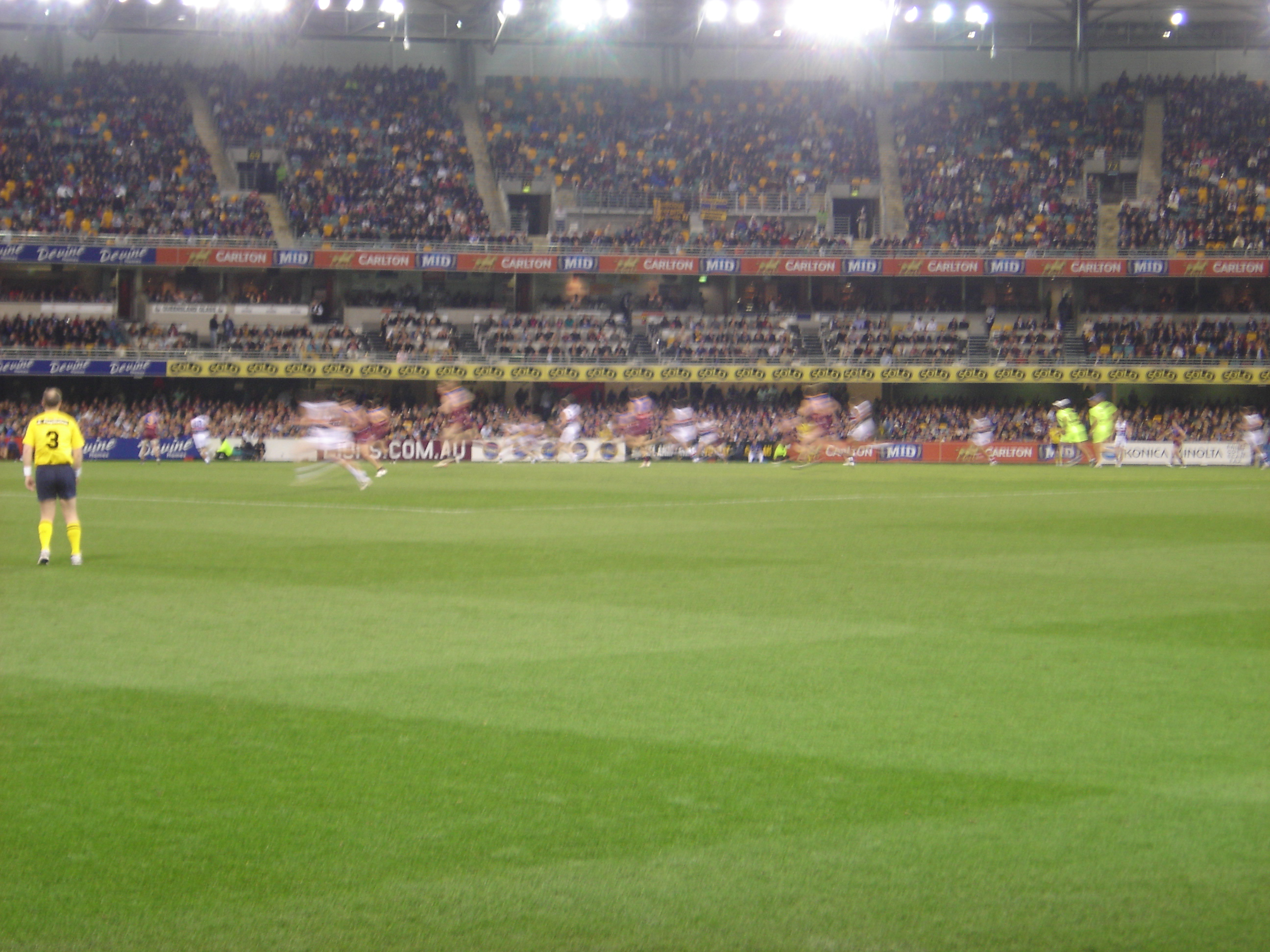
An Australian Football Match at the Gabba in 2008.

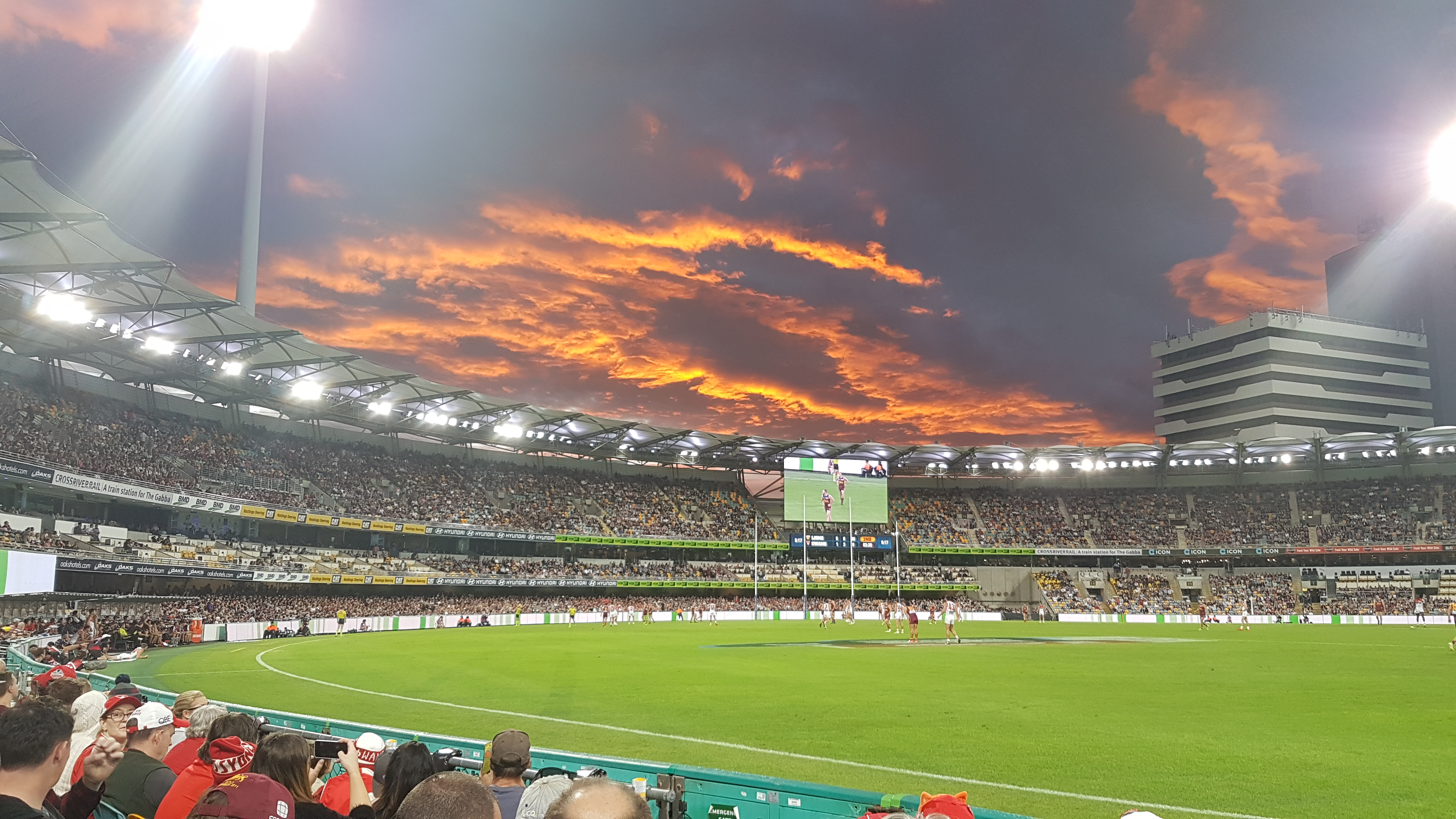
Brisbane Lions vs Sydney Swans at the Gabba looking east in 2019

The first VFL/AFL game at the Gabba was held on June 28, 1981, with Hawthorn hosting Essendon in front of 20,351 spectators. Six years later, the Brisbane Bears were admitted into the VFL, but initially play their home games at Carrara Stadium on the Gold Coast. The Brisbane Bears experimented with playing four matches at the Gabba in Brisbane in 1991, before moving all home matches to the venue ahead of the 1993 season. The Gabba was then the official home ground for the Brisbane Bears from 1993 to 1996 and since 1997 has been the home of the Brisbane Lions after the Bears merged with Fitzroy. The record crowd for an Australian rules football match is 37,473 between the Brisbane Lions and Richmond in the 2019 second qualifying final.

The Gold Coast Suns hosted games at the Gabba in 2011 and in 2018 due to the unavailability of their home ground Carrara Stadium because of redevelopment and the 2018 Commonwealth Games respectively. In addition, Melbourne played an annual home game against Brisbane at The Gabba between 2001 and 2007.

During the 2020 AFL season, the Gabba hosted a greater number of home and away matches than usual, due to the temporary relocation of Victorian and other clubs as a result of the COVID-19 pandemic. The venue was also selected to host the 2020 AFL Grand Final, with the Melbourne Cricket Ground not capable of hosting any spectators at the match. The Gabba thus became the first stadium outside the state of Victoria to host a VFL/AFL Grand Final, which Richmond won against Geelong by 12.9 (81) to 7.8 (50) in front of 29,707 people – just under the venue's temporary maximum capacity due to the pandemic.

=== Soccer ===
In the early 1900s, the Gabba hosted numerous matches between Australia and various touring nations. During the 1950s and 1960s the Gabba hosted soccer matches for English first division and Scottish clubs including Blackpool FC, Everton FC, Manchester United and Heart of Midlothian F.C. The Chinese and South African national teams also played at the ground. During the 2000 Summer Olympics, the Gabba hosted association football group games.

=== Rugby league ===
On 8 May 1909, the first match of rugby league was played in Brisbane at the Gabba. Norths played against Souths before a handful of spectators at the ground. Brisbane Rugby League games continued to be played occasionally at The Gabba until 1957 at which point Lang Park became the home of the game in the city.

The Gabba hosted its first rugby league Test match on 26 June 1909, when Australia defeated New Zealand Māori 16–13.

==== Rugby league test matches ====
The Gabba hosted 11 rugby league test matches between 1912 and 1956.

Date	Home team	Opponents	Result	Attendance	Part of
14 August 1909	Australia	Māori	16–13	8,000	1909 Māori tour
6 July 1912	Australia	New Zealand	13–10	8,000	1912 Trans-Tasman Test series
18 June 1932	Australia	(United Kingdom) The Lions	15–6	15,944	1932 Ashes series
4 July 1936	Australia	(United Kingdom) The Lions	7–12	29,486	1936 Ashes series
12 June 1948	Australia	New Zealand	13–4	23,014	1948 Trans-Tasman Test series
1 July 1950	Australia	Great Britain	15–3	35,000	1950 Ashes series
30 June 1951	Australia	France	23–11	35,000	1951 French rugby league tour of Australia and New Zealand
28 June 1952	Australia	New Zealand	29–45	29,243	1952 Trans-Tasman Test series
9 July 1954	Australia	Great Britain	21–38	46,355	1954 Ashes series (All time Gabba attendance record)
2 July 1955	Australia	France	28–29	45,745	1955 French rugby league tour of Australia and New Zealand
23 June 1956	Australia	New Zealand	8–2	28,361	1956 Trans-Tasman Test series

=== Rugby union ===
The Gabba has hosted six rugby union Test matches.

Year	Home team	Result	Opponents	Crowd
1907	Australia	5–14	New Zealand	not known
1914	Australia	0–17	New Zealand	not known
1950	Australia	6–19	British and Irish Lions	not known
1951	Australia	6–16	New Zealand	not known
2001	Australia	13–29	British and Irish Lions	37,460
2002	Australia	38–27	South Africa	37,258

=== 2000 Olympic Games ===
The Gabba hosted seven games of the 2000 Olympic Games Men's Football tournament including a quarter final match.

Date	Time (AEST)	Team #1	Result	Team #2	Round	Attendance
13 September 2000	19:00	Cameroon	3–2	Kuwait	Group C	26,730
14 September 2000	19:00	Brazil	3–1	Slovakia	Group D	24,616
16 September 2000	19:00	Czech Republic	2–3	Kuwait	Group C	22,182
17 September 2000	19:00	Brazil	1–3	South Africa	Group D	36,326
19 September 2000	19:00	Czech Republic	1–1	Cameroon	Group C	23,442
20 September 2000	19:00	Brazil	1–0	Japan	Group D	36,608
23 September 2000	19:00	Brazil	1–2 (a.e.t.)	Cameroon	Quarter final 2	37,332

== Greyhound racing ==
Greyhound racing was also conducted at the Gabba prior to the redevelopment. Meetings were held during 1928 and again from 1972 until 1993.

== Awards ==
In 2009, as part of the Q150 celebrations, the Gabba was announced as one of the Q150 Icons of Queensland for its role as a "structure and engineering feat".

== Largest crowds at the Gabba ==
The largest crowds ast the Gabba were:

Sport	Date	Crowd	Event
Concerts	4–5 March 2017	60,000	Adele Live 2017
Rugby league	9 July 1954	46,355	Ashes Australia vs Great Britain
Concerts	6 November 2018	43,907	Taylor Swift's Reputation Stadium Tour
International cricket	9 January 2006	38,894	2005–06 T20 International: Australia vs South Africa
Australian rules football	7 September 2019	37,478	2019 AFL Qualifying Final: Brisbane Lions vs Richmond
Rugby union	30 June 2001	37,460	2001 British & Irish Lions tour to Australia: British & Irish Lions vs Australia
Soccer	23 September 2000	37,332	2000 Olympic Football (men's) Brazil vs Cameroon
Domestic cricket (Big Bash League)	5 January 2018	35,564	2017–18 BBL Season: Brisbane Heat vs Perth Scorchers

== Test cricket records ==
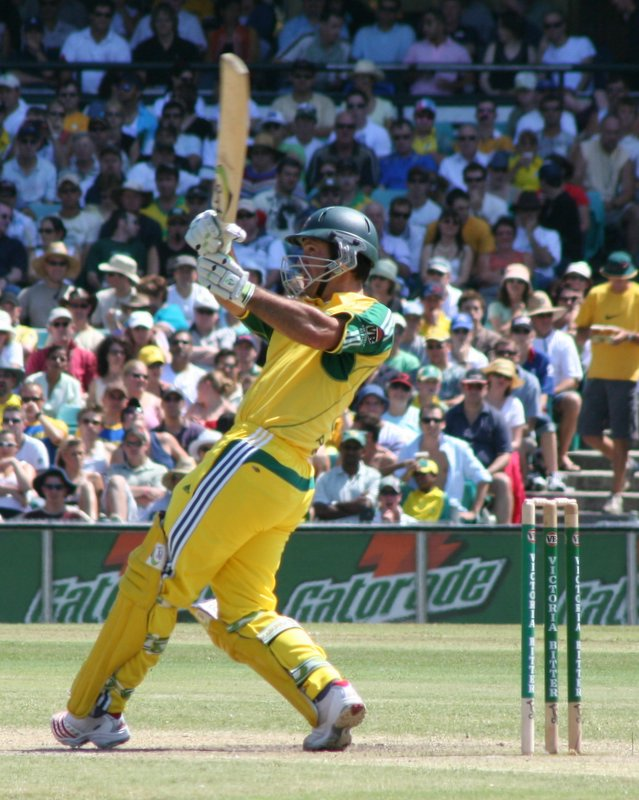
Ricky Ponting holds the record for most career runs at the Gabba.

=== Batting ===
Most career runs
Runs	Player	Period
1,335 (26 innings)	(Australia) Ricky Ponting	1996–2012
1,030 (13 innings)	(Australia) Michael Clarke	2004–2013
1,010 (21 innings)	(Australia) Steve Smith	2013–2025
1,006 (11 innings)	(Australia) Greg Chappell	1974–1983
963 (19 innings)	(Australia) David Warner	2011–2022

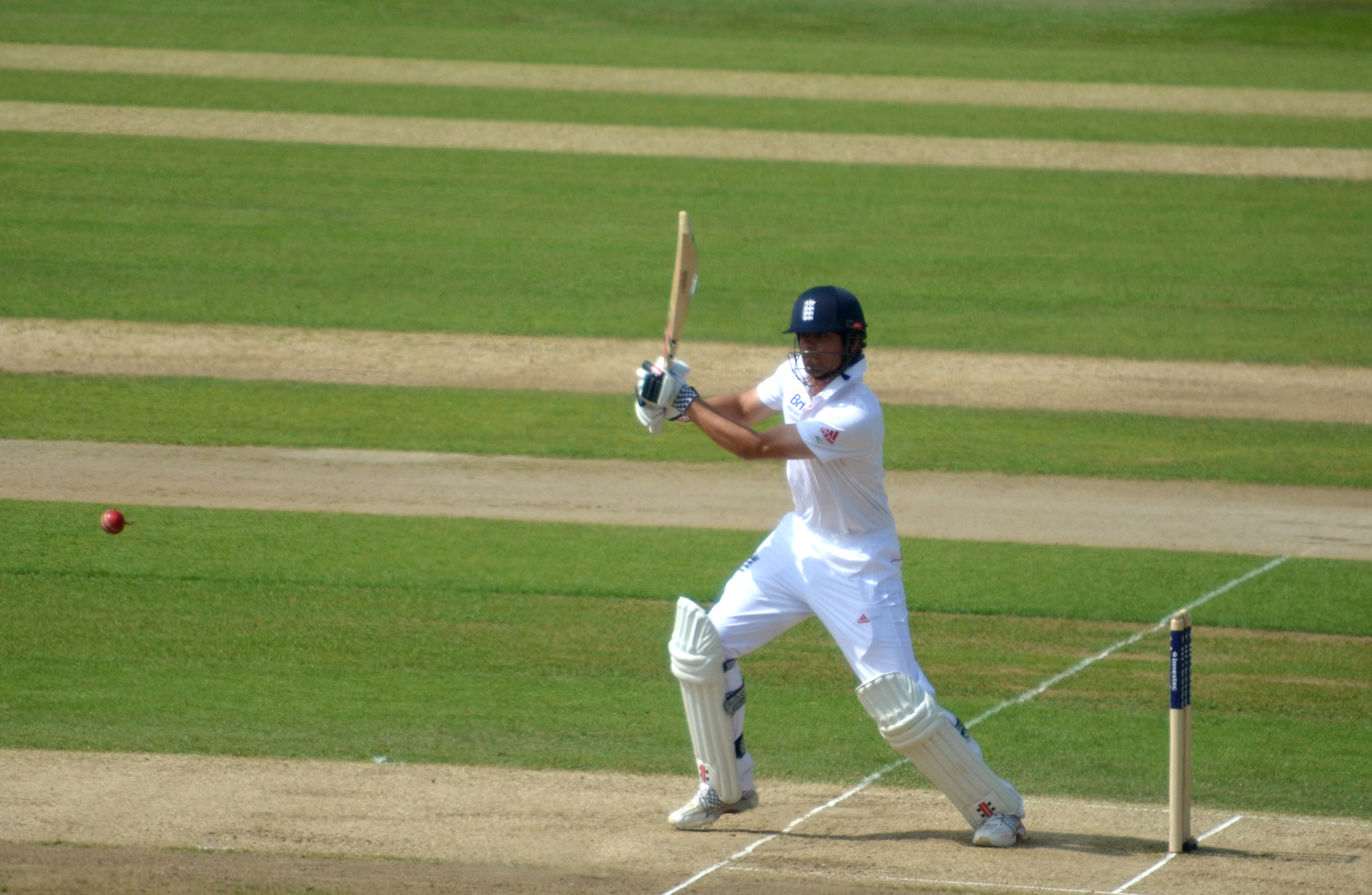
Alastair Cook holds the record for most career runs at the ground by a non-Australian.

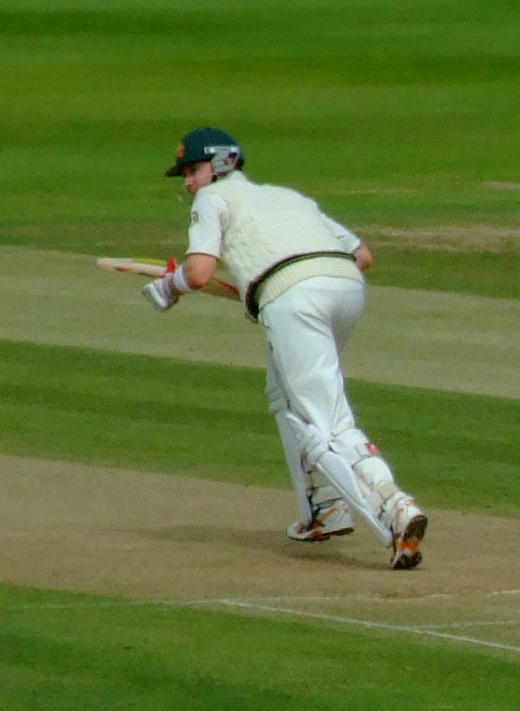
Michael Clarke scored 259* against South Africa in 2012, the highest score at the ground.

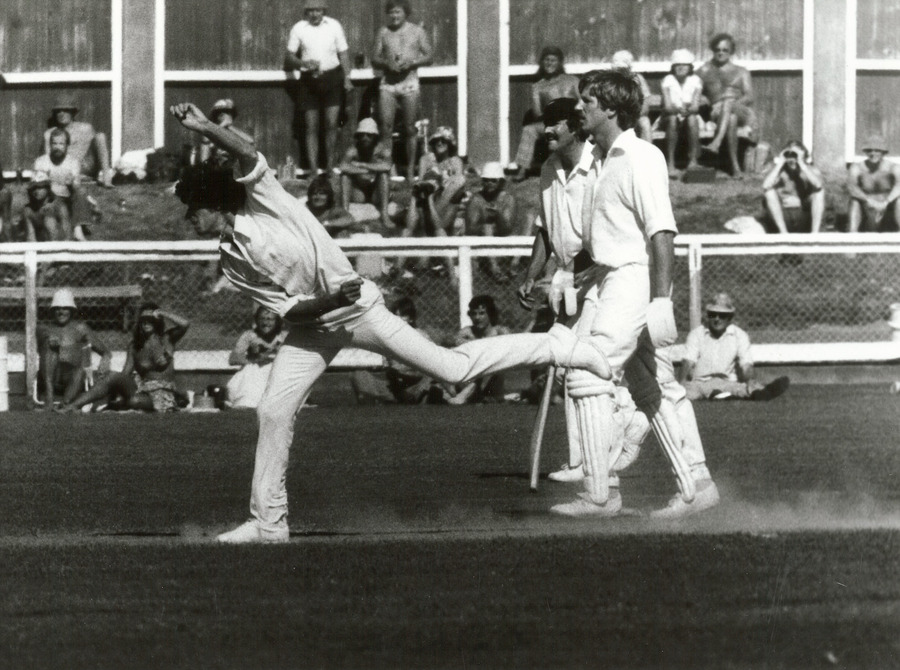
Richard Hadlee took 21 wickets in six innings, the most by a non-Australian.

Most career runs (non-Australia)
Runs	Player	Period
443 (8 innings)	(England) Alastair Cook	2006–2017
336 (8 innings)	(England) Joe Root	2013–2025
314 (6 innings)	(Cricket West Indies) Richie Richardson	1984–1992
298 (8 innings)	(England) David Gower	1978–1990
278 (3 innings)	(New Zealand) Martin Crowe	1985–1987

Highest individual scores
Runs	Player	Date
259* v. South Africa	(Australia) Michael Clarke	9 Nov 2012
235* v. Australia	(England) Alastair Cook	25 Nov 2010
226 v. South Africa	(Australia) Don Bradman	27 Nov 1931
207 v. England	(Australia) Keith Stackpole	27 Nov 1970
201 v. Pakistan	(Australia) Greg Chappell	27 Nov 1981

Most centuries
Centuries	Player	Period
5 (11 innings)	(Australia) Greg Chappell	1974–1983
5 (13 innings)	(Australia) Michael Clarke	2004–2013
4 (15 innings)	(Australia) Matthew Hayden	2000–2008
4 (21 innings)	(Australia) Steve Smith	2013–2025
4 (19 innings)	(Australia) David Warner	2011–2022
4 (26 innings)	(Australia) Ricky Ponting	1996–2012

Highest batting average (3+ matches)
Average	Player	Period
111.77 (11 innings, 2 NO)	(Australia) Greg Chappell	1974–1983
105.33 (4 innings, 1 NO)	(Australia) Brian Booth	1962–1965
105.14 (7 innings, 0 NO)	(Australia) Don Bradman	1931–1947
103.00 (13 innings, 3 NO)	(Australia) Michael Clarke	2004–2013
85.16 (8 innings, 2 NO)	(Australia) Doug Walters	1965–1980

=== Bowling ===
Most career wickets
Wickets	Player	Period
68 (22 innings)	(Australia) Shane Warne	1993–2006
65 (26 innings)	(Australia) Glenn McGrath	1993–2006
58 (26 innings)	(Australia) Mitchell Starc	2011–2025
52 (27 innings)	(Australia) Nathan Lyon	2011–2024
44 (16 innings)	(Australia) Pat Cummins	2011–2024

Most career wickets (non-Australia)
Wickets	Player	Period
21 (6 innings)	(New Zealand) Richard Hadlee	1980–1987
19 (6 innings)	(England) Bob Willis	1974–1982
18 (9 innings)	(Cricket West Indies) Courtney Walsh	1984–2000
15 (6 innings)	(Cricket West Indies) Curtly Ambrose	1988–1996
14 (5 innings)	(New Zealand) Chris Cairns	1993–2001
14 (4 innings)	(Cricket West Indies) Lance Gibbs	1968–1975

Best innings figures
Figures	Player	Date
9/52 v. Australia	(New Zealand) Richard Hadlee	8 Nov 1985
8/71 v. England	(Australia) Shane Warne	25 Nov 1994
7/23 v. Pakistan	(Australia) Shane Warne	9 Nov 1995
7/60 v. England	(Australia) Keith Miller	29 Nov 1946
7/68 v. Australia	(Cricket West Indies) Shamar Joseph	25 Jan 2024

Best match figures
Figures	Player	Date
15/123 v. Australia	(New Zealand) Richard Hadlee	8 Nov 1985
11/31 v. India	(Australia) Ernie Toshack	28 Nov 1947
11/77 v. Pakistan	(Australia) Shane Warne	9 Nov 1995
11/110 v. England	(Australia) Shane Warne	25 Nov 1994
11/134 v. England	(Australia) Geoff Lawson	26 Nov 1982
11/222 v. West Indies	(Australia) Alan Davidson	9 Dec 1960

Lowest strike rate (4+ innings)
Strike rate	Player	Period
22.7 (20 wickets)	(Australia) Ernie Toshack	1946–1947
32.4 (13 wickets)	(England) Gubby Allen	1933–1936
37.5 (4 wickets)	(Australia) Mitchell Marsh	2014–2024
37.9 (31 wickets)	(Australia) Dennis Lillee	1974–1983
38.2 (17 wickets)	(Australia) Stuart Clark	2006–2008

=== Team records ===
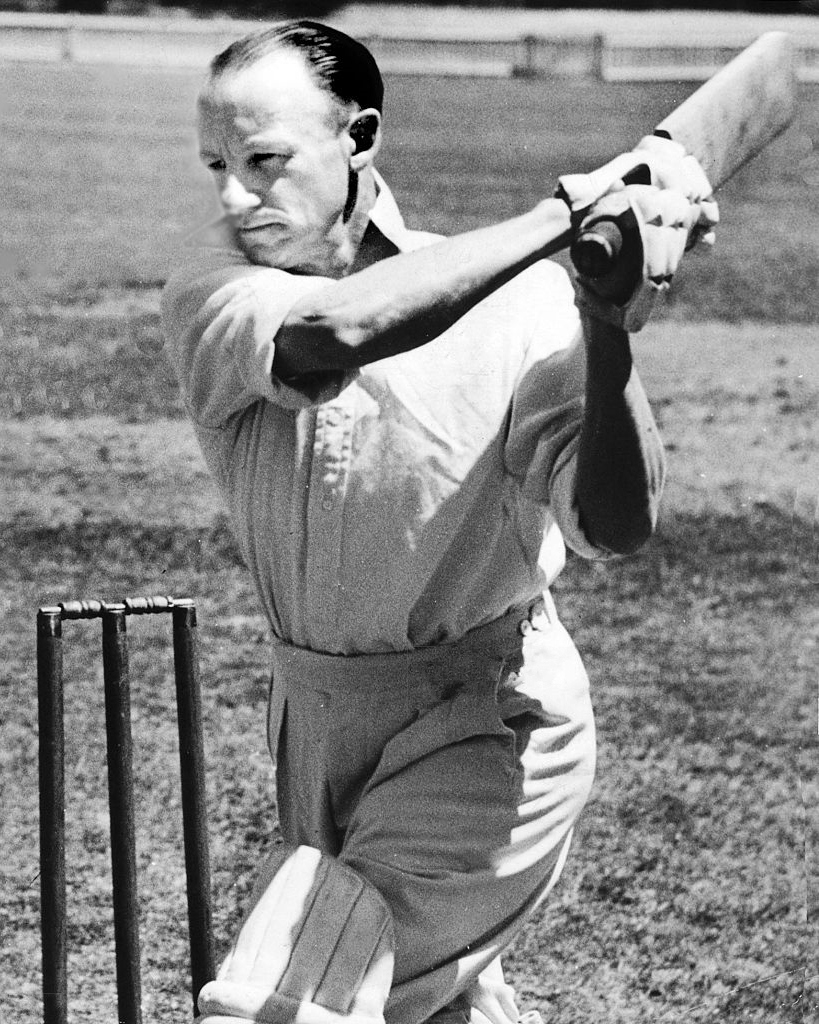
Bradman made 187 after a controversial non-catch on 28 runs, as Australia totalled 645 in 1946.

Highest innings scores
Score	Team	Date
645	Australia v. England	29 Nov 1946
6/607d	Australia v. New Zealand	3 Dec 1993
9/602d	Australia v. England	23 Nov 2006
8/601d	Australia v. England	26 Nov 1954
585	Australia v. New Zealand	18 Nov 2004

Lowest completed innings
Score	Team	Date
58	Australia v. England	4 Dec 1936
58	India v. Australia	28 Nov 1947
76	New Zealand v. Australia	18 Nov 2004
79	England v. Australia	7 Nov 2002
82	(Cricket West Indies) West Indies v. Australia	23 Nov 2000

=== Partnership records ===
Highest partnerships
Runs	Wicket	Players	Match	Date
329*	2nd	Alastair Cook (235*) & Jonathan Trott (135*)	England v. Australia	25 Nov 2010
307	6th	Michael Hussey (195) & Brad Haddin (136)	Australia v. England	25 Nov 2010
276	3rd	Don Bradman (187) & Lindsay Hassett (128)	Australia v. England	29 Nov 1946
272	2nd	Matthew Hayden (197) & Ricky Ponting (123)	Australia v. England	7 Nov 2002
269	1st	Michael Slater (169) & Greg Blewett (89)	Australia v. Pakistan	5 Nov 1999

Highest partnerships by wicket
Runs	Wicket	Players	Match	Date
269	1st	Michael Slater (169) & Greg Blewett (89)	Australia v. Pakistan	5 Nov 1999
329*	2nd	Alastair Cook (235*) & Jonathan Trott (135*)	England v. Australia	25 Nov 2010
276	3rd	Don Bradman (187) & Lindsay Hassett (128)	Australia v. England	29 Nov 1946
259	4th	Michael Clarke (259*) & Ed Cowan (136)	Australia v. South Africa	9 Nov 2012
228	5th	Michael Clarke (259*) & Michael Hussey (100)	Australia v. South Africa	9 Nov 2012
307	6th	Michael Hussey (195) & Brad Haddin (136)	Australia v. England	25 Nov 2010
148	7th	Steve Smith (133) & Mitchell Johnson (88)	Australia v. India	17 Dec 2014
135	8th	Adam Gilchrist (118) & Brett Lee (61)	Australia v. New Zealand	8 Nov 2001
92	9th	Eddie Paynter (83) & Hedley Verity (23*)	England v. Australia	10 Feb 1933
114	10th	Glenn McGrath (61) & Jason Gillespie (54*)	Australia v. New Zealand	18 Nov 2004

All records correct as of 11 January 2026.

== VFL/AFL records ==
=== Player records ===
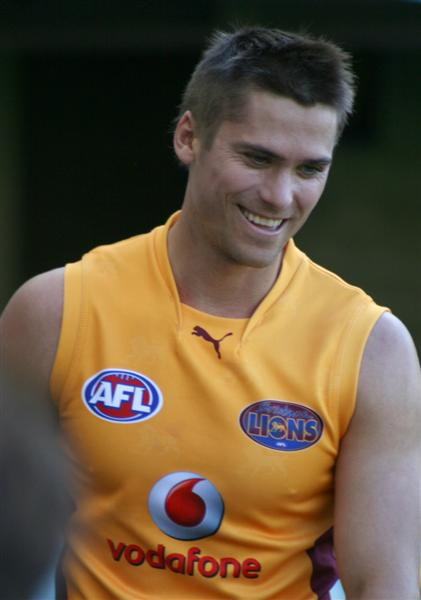
Simon Black holds the record for most games played at the Gabba.

Most career games
Games	Player	Period
170	Simon Black	1998–2013
149	Luke Power	1998–2012
147	Nigel Lappin	1994–2008
147	Michael Voss	1992–2006
137	Daniel Rich	2009–2022

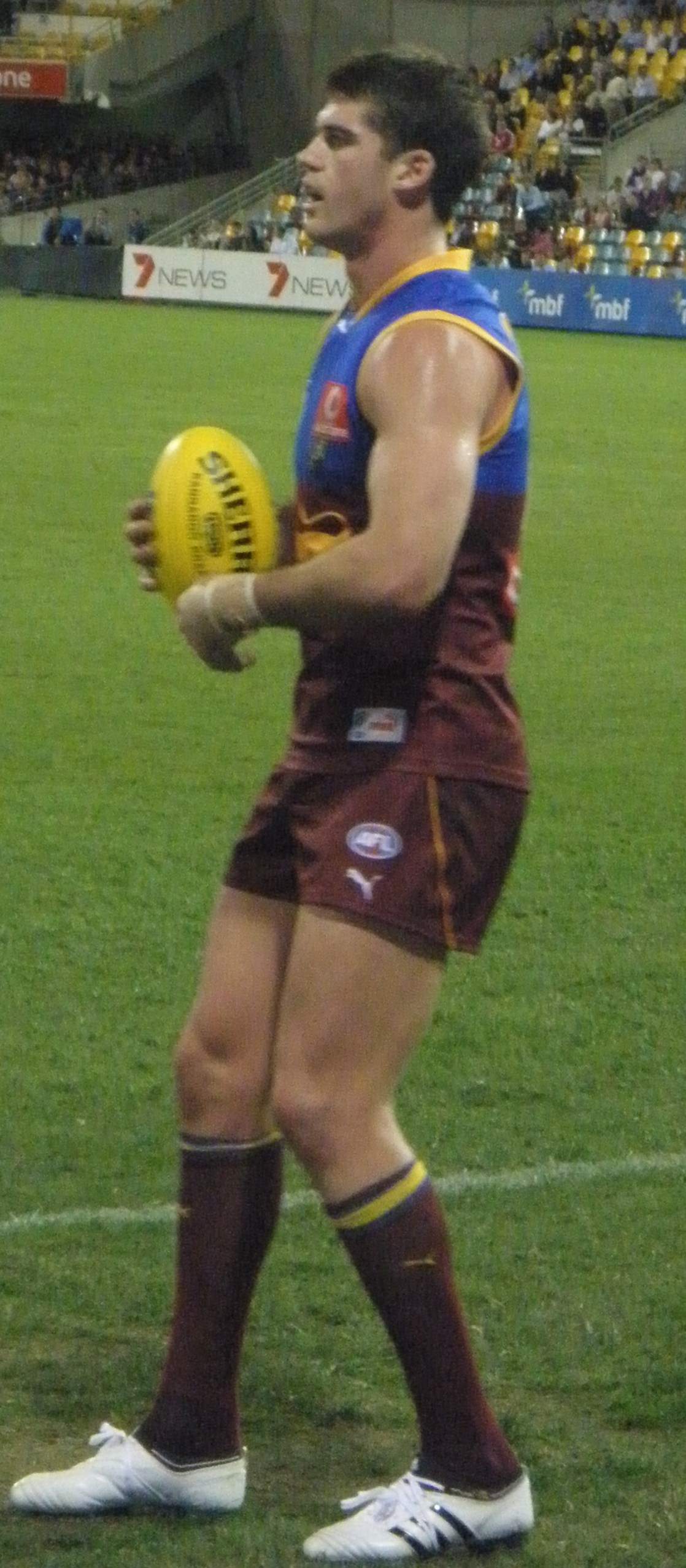
Jonathan Brown holds the record for most goals kicked at the Gabba.

Most career goals
Goals	Player	Period
323	Jonathan Brown	2000–2014
295	Alastair Lynch	1988–2004
290	Daniel Bradshaw	1996–2010
184	Jason Akermanis	1995–2010
140	Michael Voss	1992–2006

Most goals in a match
Goals	Player	Match	Date
11	Billy Brownless	Geelong v. Brisbane Bears	14 Apr 1991
10	Jonathan Brown	Brisbane Lions v. Carlton	22 Jul 2007
10	Jason Dunstall	Hawthorn v. Brisbane Bears	29 Aug 1993
10	Tony Lockett	St Kilda v. Brisbane Bears	12 May 1991
9	Daniel Bradshaw	Brisbane Lions v. Melbourne	2 Jul 2005
9	Lance Whitnall	Carlton v. Brisbane Lions	25 Jun 2000

Most disposals in a match
Disposals	Player	Match	Date
47	Tom Rockliff	Brisbane Lions v. Gold Coast	26 Jul 2014
46	Tom Mitchell	Hawthorn v. Brisbane Lions	20 May 2018
45	Jack Macrae	Western Bulldogs v. Brisbane Lions	4 Aug 2019
45	Tom Rockliff	Brisbane Lions v. Fremantle	24 Aug 2014
45	Pearce Hanley	Brisbane Lions v. Gold Coast	26 Jul 2014

=== Team records ===
- Highest score: Brisbane Bears 33.21 (219) defeated Sydney 8.9 (57), 16 May 1993
- Lowest score: Sydney 3.8 (26) defeated by Richmond 4.10 (34), 12 July 2020
- Biggest margin: Brisbane Bears defeated Sydney, 162 points, 16 May 1993

Last updated: 1 October 2022.

== See also ==
- Lang Park
- List of Australian Football League grounds
- List of Big Bash League venues
- List of cricket grounds in Australia
- List of Oceanian stadiums by capacity
- List of sports venues in Australia
- List of Test cricket grounds
