= List of Big Bash League venues =

This is a list of all venues which have hosted at least one Big Bash League match.

== Primary venues ==
Venue	City	First	Matches	Home of
Adelaide Oval	Adelaide	2011	69	Adelaide Strikers
The Gabba	Brisbane	2011	60	Brisbane Heat
Bellerive Oval	Hobart	2011	59	Hobart Hurricanes
Docklands Stadium	Melbourne	2011	60	Melbourne Renegades
Melbourne Cricket Ground	Melbourne	2011	61	Melbourne Stars
Perth Stadium	Perth	2018	34	Perth Scorchers
Sydney Cricket Ground	Sydney	2011	61	Sydney Sixers
Sydney Showground Stadium	Sydney	2015	38	Sydney Thunder

== Secondary venues ==
Venue	City	First	Last	Matches	Used primarily by
Carrara Stadium	Gold Coast	2019	2023	8	Brisbane Heat & Melbourne Stars
Cazalys Stadium	Cairns	2022	2022	1	Brisbane Heat
Coffs Harbour International Stadium	Coffs Harbour	2020	2024	5	Sydney Sixers
Kardinia Park	Geelong	2017	2023	5	Melbourne Renegades
Lavington Sports Ground	Albury	2022	2023	1	Sydney Thunder
Manuka Oval	Canberra	2015	2019	5	Sydney Thunder
Ted Summerton Reserve	Moe	2018	2019	3	Melbourne Stars
Traeger Park	Alice Springs	2017	2019	3	Hobart Hurricanes
York Park	Launceston	2017	2023	1	Hobart Hurricanes
Junction Oval	St. Kilda	2022	2023	2	Melbourne Stars
North Sydney Oval	North Sydney	2022	2023	1	Sydney Sixers

== Former venues ==
Venue	City	First	Last	Matches	Home of
Stadium Australia	Sydney	2011	2015	14	Sydney Thunder
WACA Ground	Perth	2011	2018	35	Perth Scorchers
