= List of historic properties in Scottsdale, Arizona =

- City
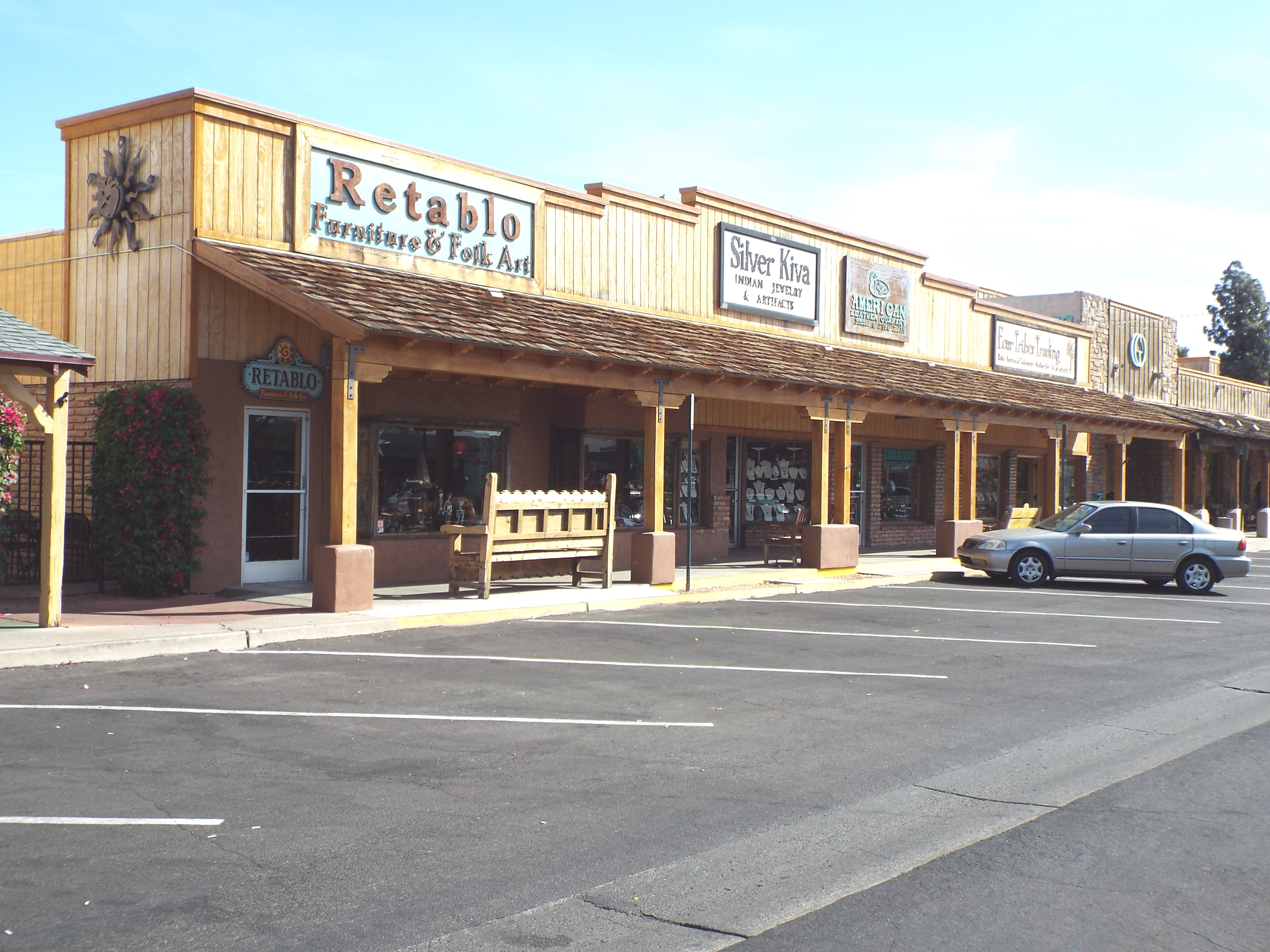
- East 1st Avenue in Old Town Scottsdale.

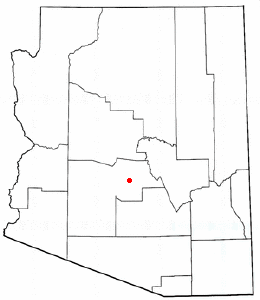
- Location in Maricopa County and the state of Arizona

This is a list of historic properties in Scottsdale, Arizona, which includes a photographic gallery of some of the towns historic structures. Some of these structures are listed in the National Register of Historic Places. Others are listed by the Scottsdale Historic Register. Also included are the photographs of other items of historic value.

== Brief history ==
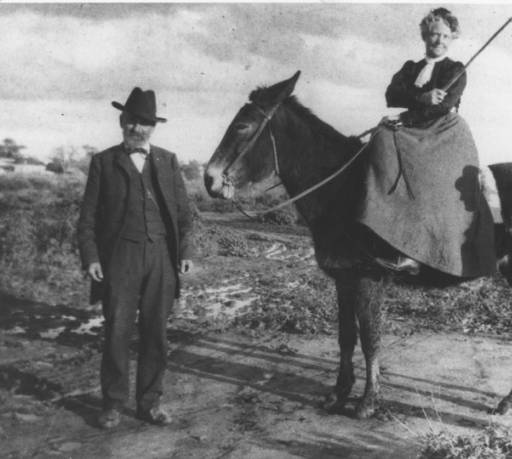
Winfield & Helen Scott, 1900

Present day Scottsdale was founded by U.S. Army Chaplain Winfield Scott, who in 1888, moved to the area with his wife Helen and brother George Washington Scott (he is not to be confused with the Florida plantation owner and Confederate Army officer with the same name). Winfield Scott believed in the agricultural potential of the area. He therefore, purchased 640 acres for the sum of $3.50 (equivalent to $125 in 2025) an acre for a stretch of land where Downtown Scottsdale is now located. The Scotts and other residents first named the small town Orangedale. The reason behind this was that the Scott brothers had planted large citrus groves. The brothers also cultivated citrus fruits, figs, potatoes, peanuts and almonds in the desert town. In 1894, the citizens of the town changed the town's name to Scottsdale after its founder. The town was incorporation in 1951 and its population continued to rapidly grow. There are some buildings of historic significance still remaining in the area known as "Old Town Scottsdale". Old Town Scottsdale houses many local businesses and is located on the original townsite of Scottsdale.

One of Scottsdales prominent winter residents was architect Frank Lloyd Wright. In 1931, Wright built Taliesin West, located at 12345 N. Taliesin Drive. Taliesin West was the winter home and school of Wright. While building his home, contractors discovered ancient Hohokam petrographs. Some of these adorn the property. Wright lived there from 1931 to 1959, year of his death. The property was listed in the National Register of Historic Places on February 12, 1974, reference: 74000457.

The City Council of Scottsdale established the Scottsdale Historic Preservation Program. According to the Scottsdale Historic Preservation Program, their aim is to "increase public awareness of Scottsdale's heritage; identify historic and cultural resources; designate and recognize significant local resources; and assist in protecting, preserving and enhancing the buildings and structures that best represent Scottsdale's past." The Scottsdale Historic Preservation Program has recognized the following as historic districts:.

- Village Grove 1-6 Historic District (1957) – N 68th Street & E Oak Street.
- Town and Country Scottsdale Historic District (1959) – N 74th Street & E Oak Street.
- Villa Monterey Units 1-7 Historic District (1961–1969) – E Chaparral Road & N Miller Road.

The Scottsdale Historic Preservation Program requires that the Historic Preservation Commission review and approve exterior alterations and/or demolition requests for buildings on the Scottsdale Historic Register. Therefore, the listing if a historic property on the register does not mean that the same may someday be demolished by the owner.

== Old Town Scottsdale ==
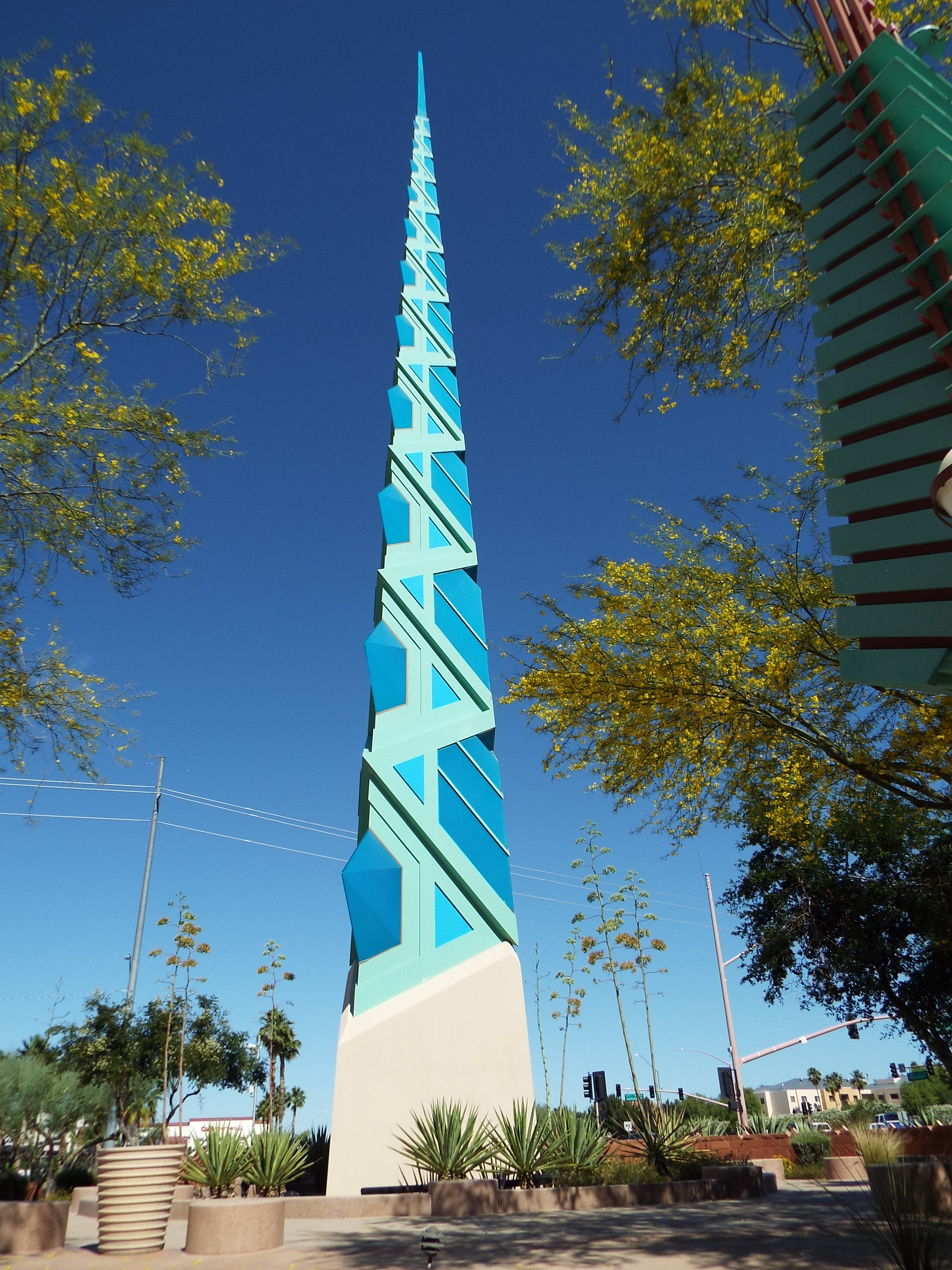
The Scottsdale Spire

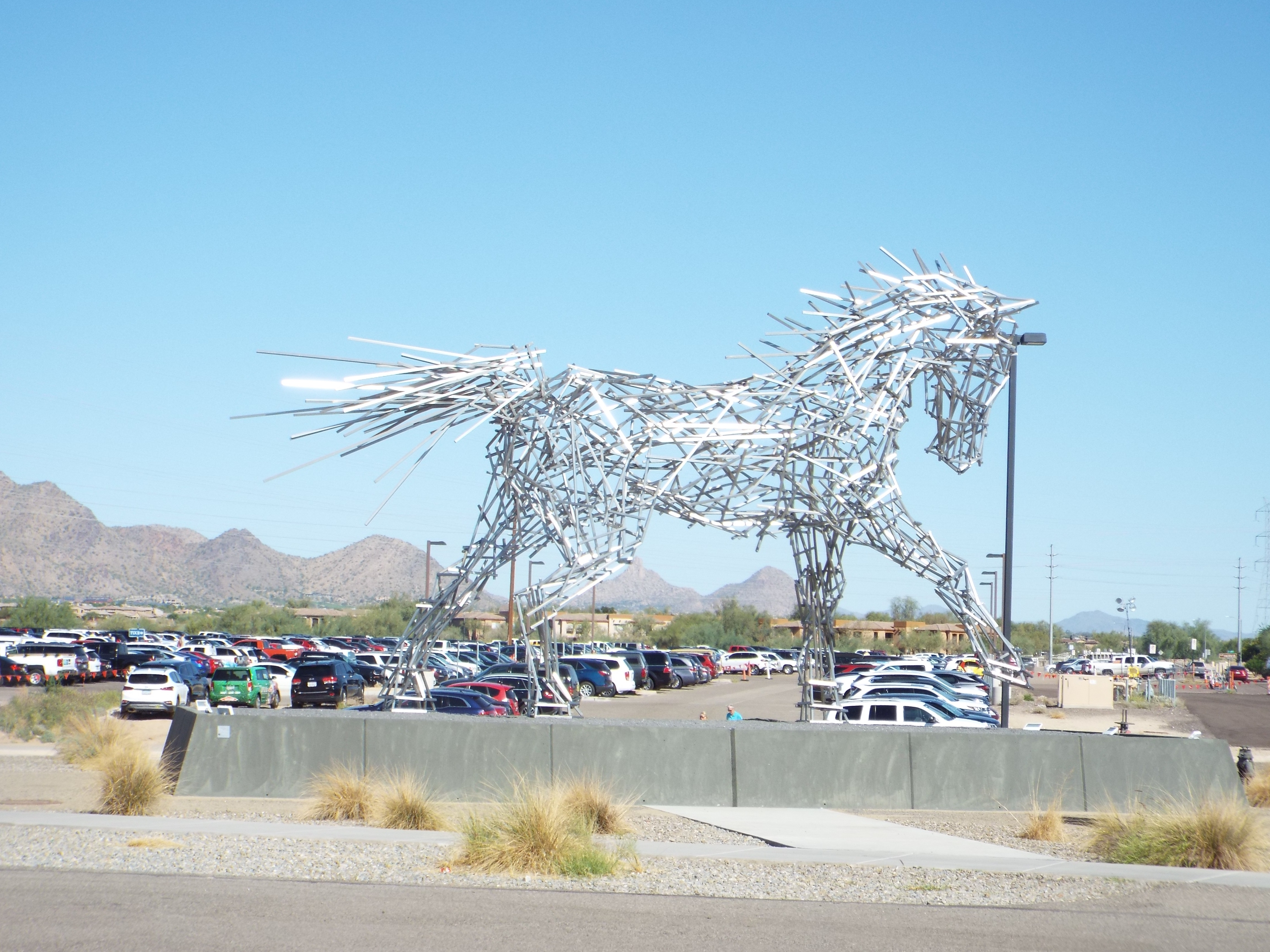
Impulsion

Old Town Scottsdale is located on the original townsite of Scottsdale. The following is a brief description of the historic buildings pictured in this section.

- Cavalliere's Blacksmith Shop in Old Town Scottsdale. Built in 1920 and located at 3805 N Brown Ave. Date placed on Scottsdale Historic Register: May 23, 2000 by Resolution No. 5550.
- The Sterling Drug Store building was built in 1921 and is located on the corner of N. Brown Avenue & E. 1st Avenue. It was renovated in 1948 and now houses Saba's Department Store. It is listed in the Scottsdale Historic Register.
- Farmer's State Bank (now housing the Rusty Spur Saloon) in Old Town Scottsdale. Built in 1921 and located at 7245 E Main St. Date placed on the Scottsdale Historic Register: May 23, 2000 by Resolution No. 5550.
- The First U.S. Post Office Building in Scottsdale (now housing Porter's Western Store) in Old Town Scottsdale. Built in 1929 and located at 3944 North Brown Avenue. Date placed on Scottsdale Historic Register: May 23, 2000 by Resolution No. 5550
- Johnny Rose's Pool Hall (now housing the Mexican Importsstore) located in Old Town Scottsdale. Built in 1923 and located at 3933 N Brown Ave. Date placed on Scottsdale Historic Register: October 3, 2000 by Ordinance No. 3341, 22-ZN-2000.
- "Our Lady of Perpetual Help Church" – The historic old adobe mission was built in 1933 and is located at 3817 N. Brown St.. The church is listed in the Scottsdale Historic Register and on September 24, 2018, was listed in the National Register of Historic Places, ref. #100002979.
- The Western Motor Service building was built in 1950 and is located on the corner of N. Scottsdale Road & E. 1st Avenue. The building, which was altered in 1958, now houses the Sugar Bowl Restaurant. It is listed in the Scottsdale Historic Register.
- The Lu Lu Belle Building was built in 1953 and located at 7212 E. Main St. It was a Gay Nineties themed bar and diner restaurant.
- Sprouse-Reitz Drugstore in Old Town Scottsdale. Built in 1954 and located at 831 N Scottsdale Rd. The building now houses the Pink Pony Steak House. It is listed in the Scottsdale Historic Register.
- Noriega's Home and Livery Stable in Old Town Scottsdale. Built in 1920 and located at 3802 N. Brown Ave. It was originally owned by Gerbacio "Harvey" Noriega and served as the home of the Noriega family, one of Scottsdale's first settlers. The property is listed in the Scottsdale Historic Register.

Monuments pictured

- The Scottsdale Spire – located in the southeast corner of Bell and Scottsdale Avenues in Scottsdale was an Arizona State Capital Project designed by Frank Lloyd Wright. Its construction began in 1957, but due to Wright's death, it wasn't until 2007, that it was adopted and finished by the Taliesin Associated Architects.
- Impulsion – a massive metal horse by artist Jeff Zischke which was unveiled on December 12, 2014, in the newly renovated equidome and North Hall at WestWorld in Scottsdale. The name Impulsion referrers to the movement of a horse when it is going forward with controlled power.

== Historic structures pictured ==
The following are the images of the historic buildings in Scottsdale and its surrounding areas.

Old Town Scottsdale

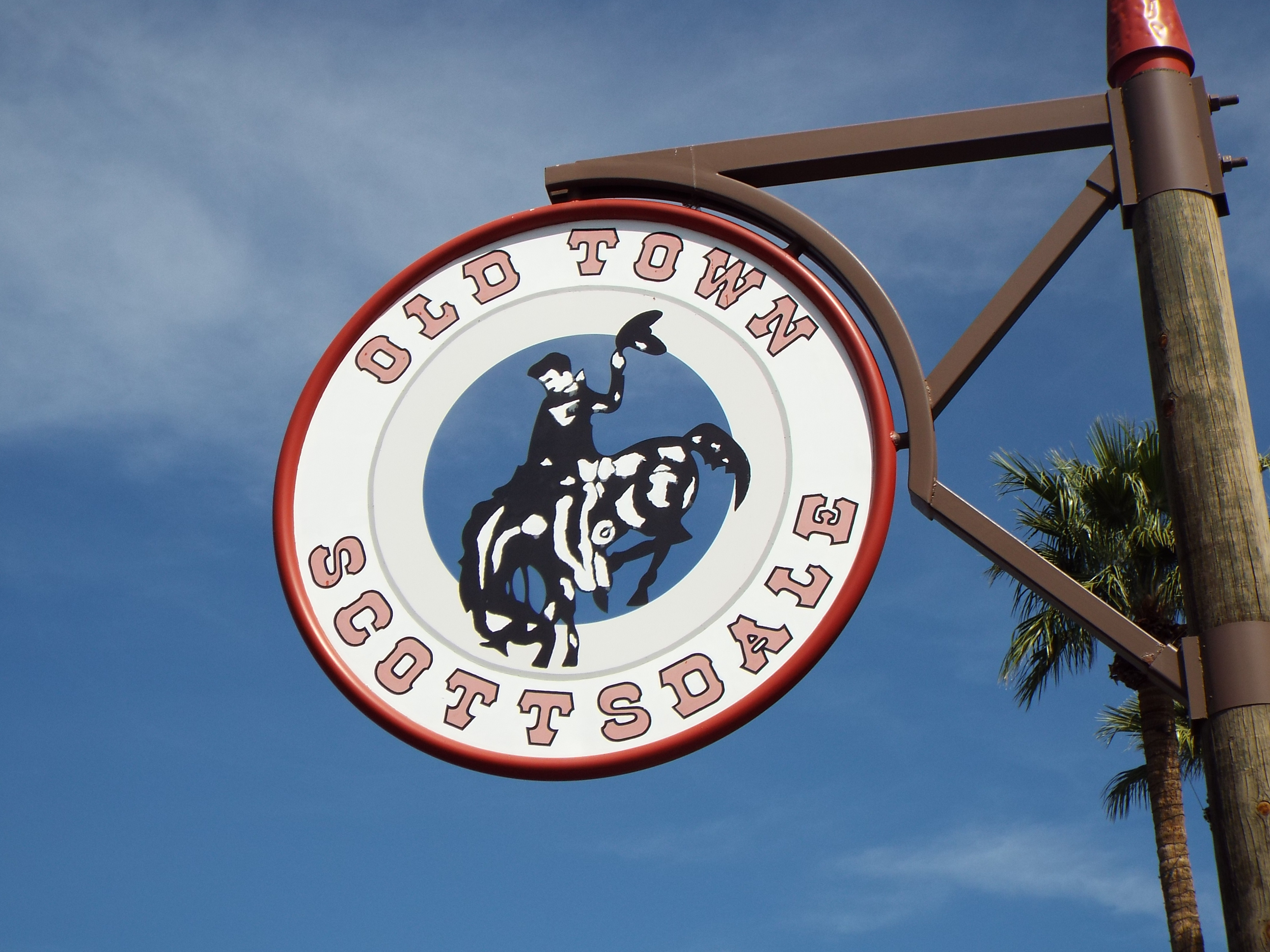
Corner of East 1st Avenue in Old Town Scottsdale.

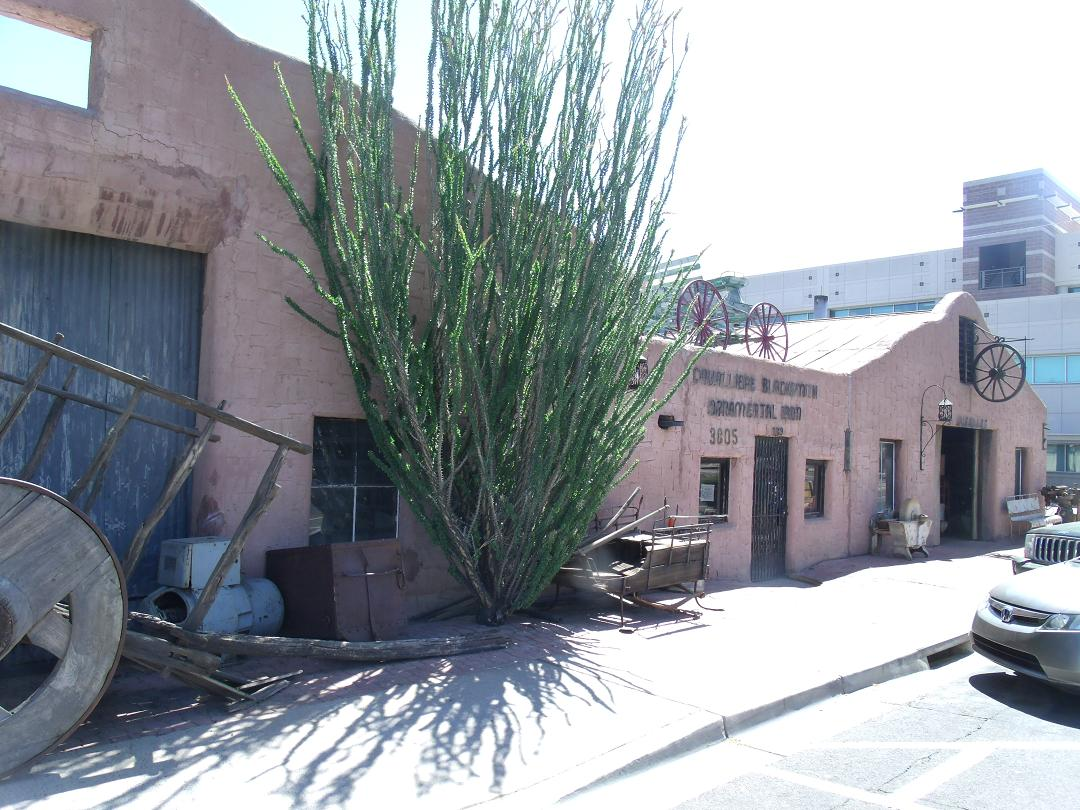
Cavalliere's Blacksmith Shop.

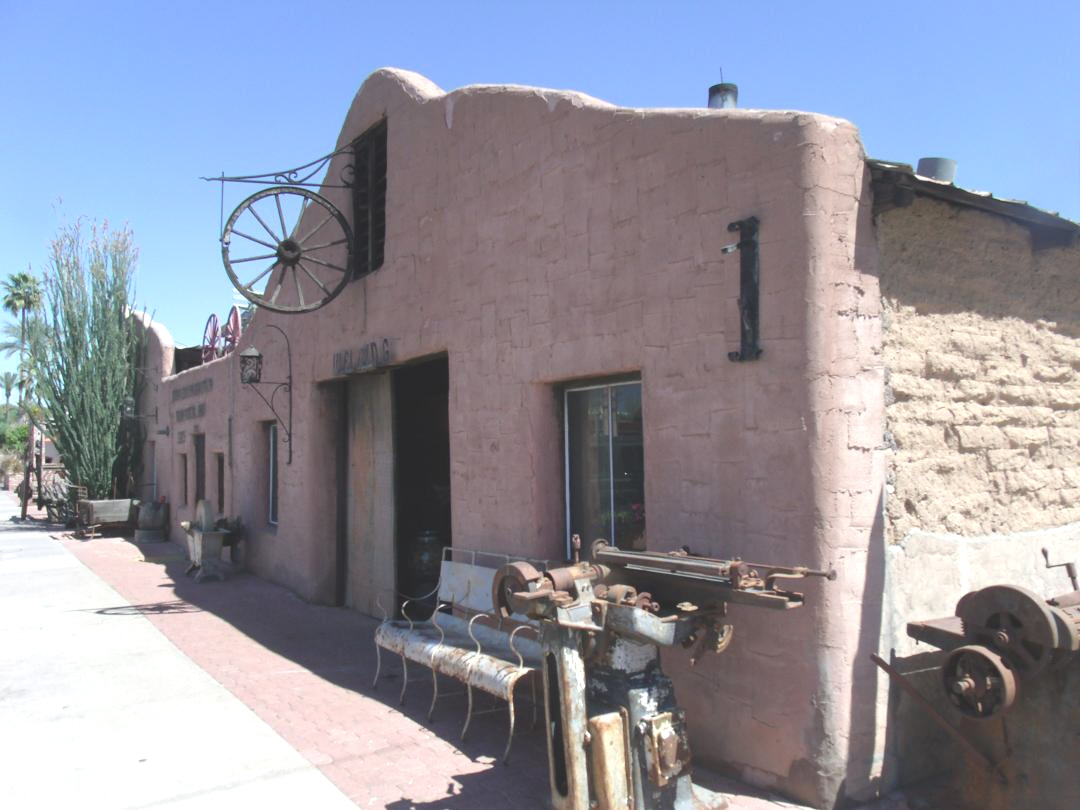
Different view of Cavalliere's Blacksmith Shop.

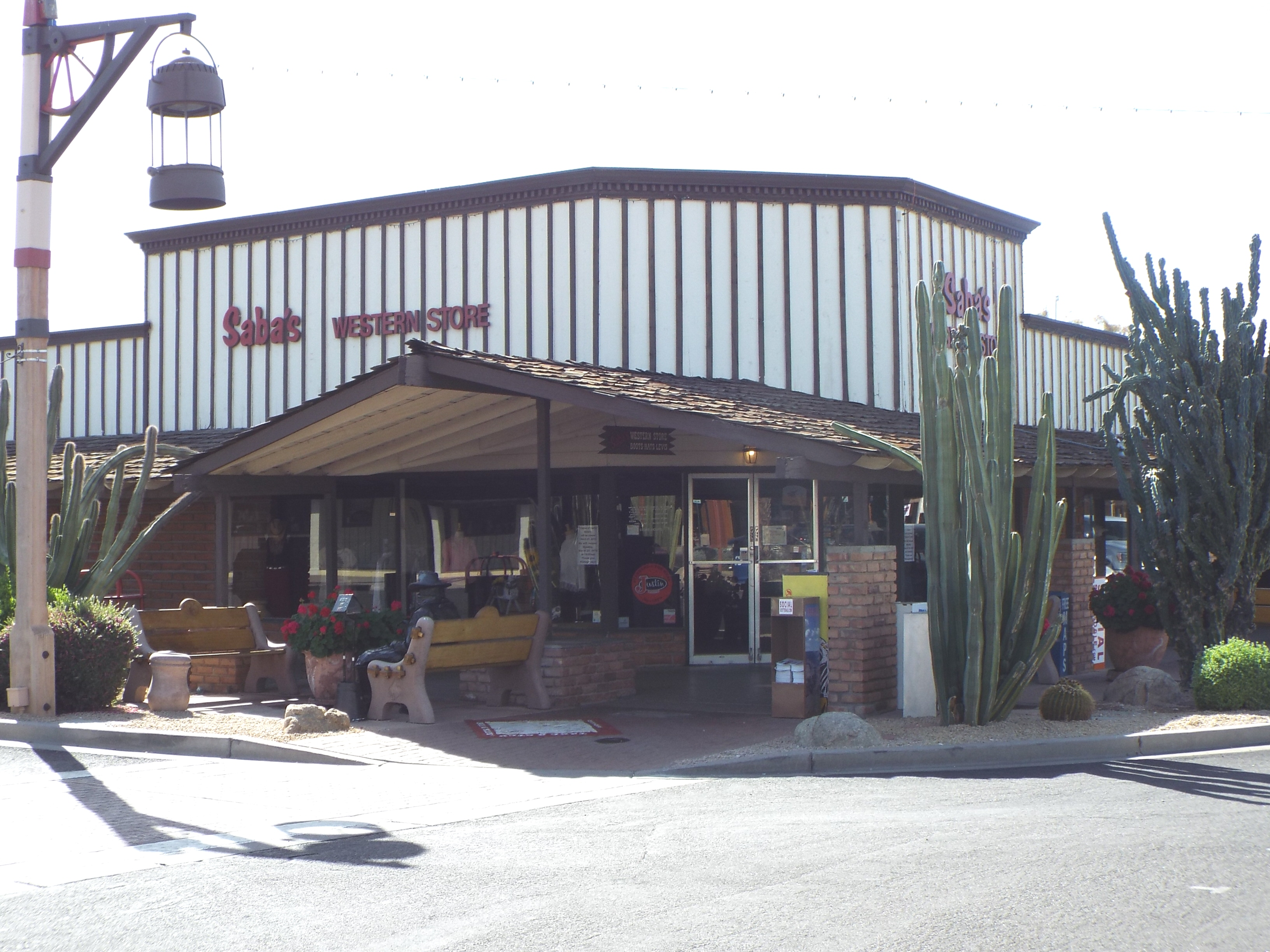
The Sterling Drug Store.

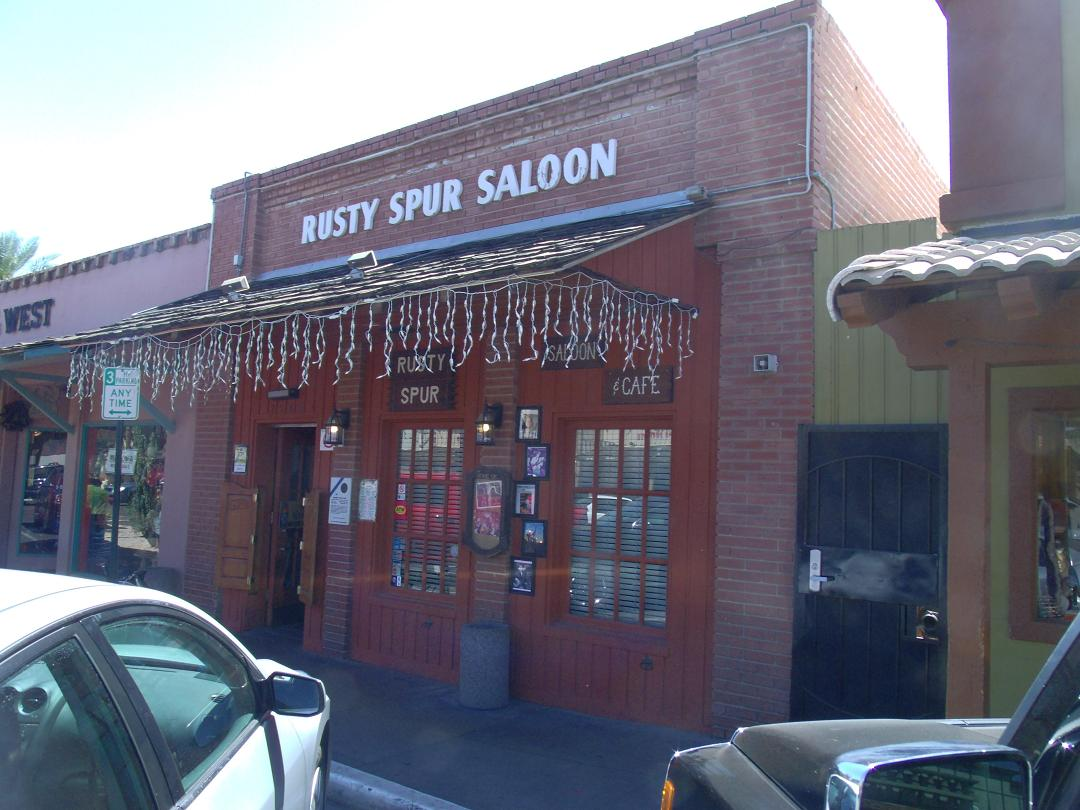
Farmer's State Bank (now housing the Rusty Spur Saloon) .

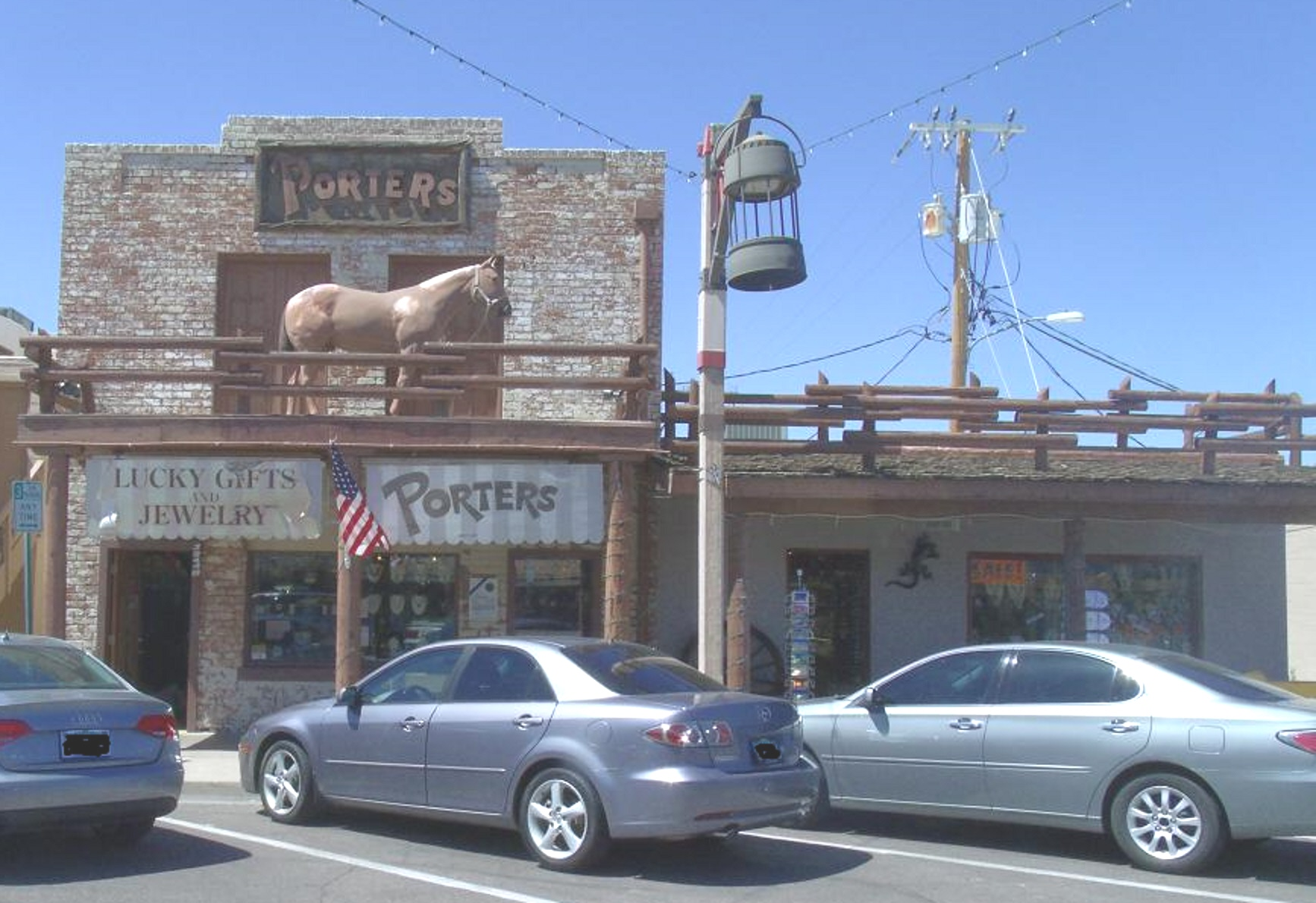
The first U.S. Post Office Building in Scottsdale.

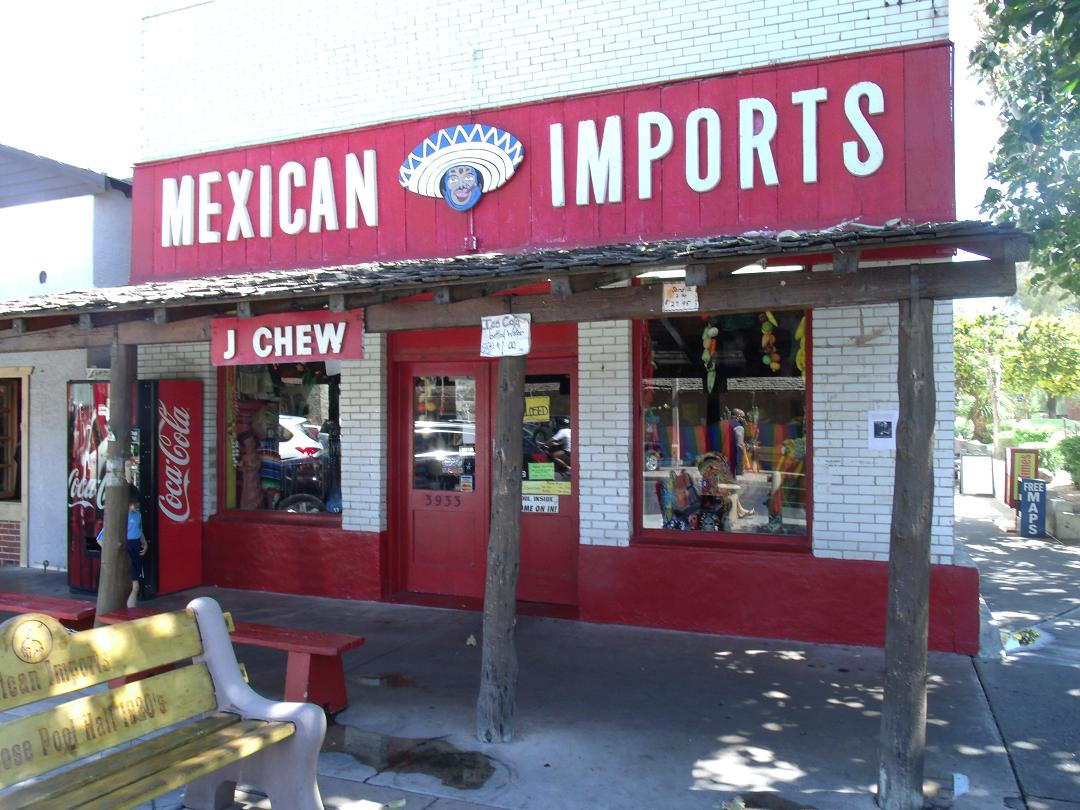
Johnny Rose's Pool Hall (now housing the Mexican Importsstore).

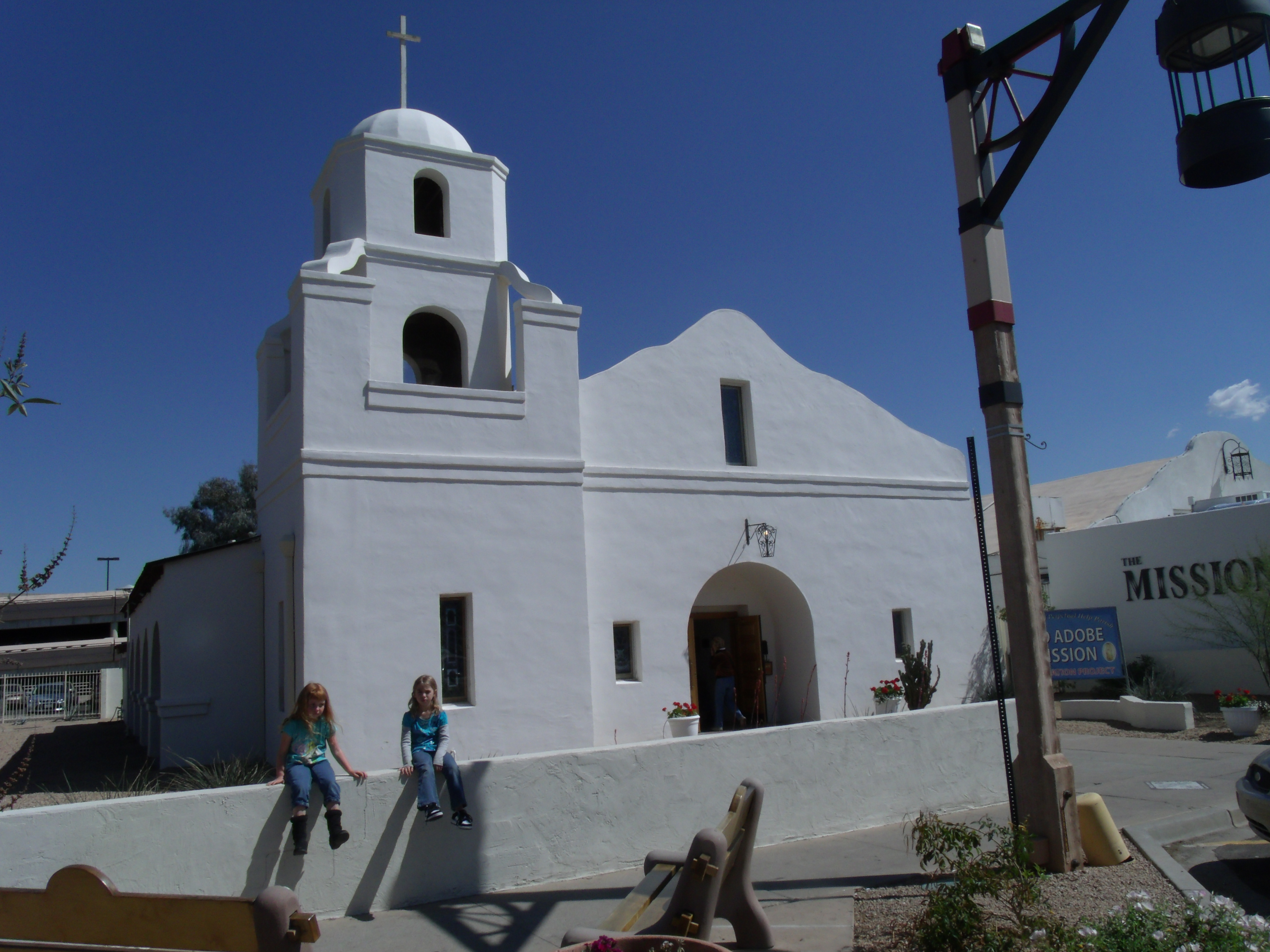
Historic Old Adobe Mission "Our Lady of Perpetual Help Church".

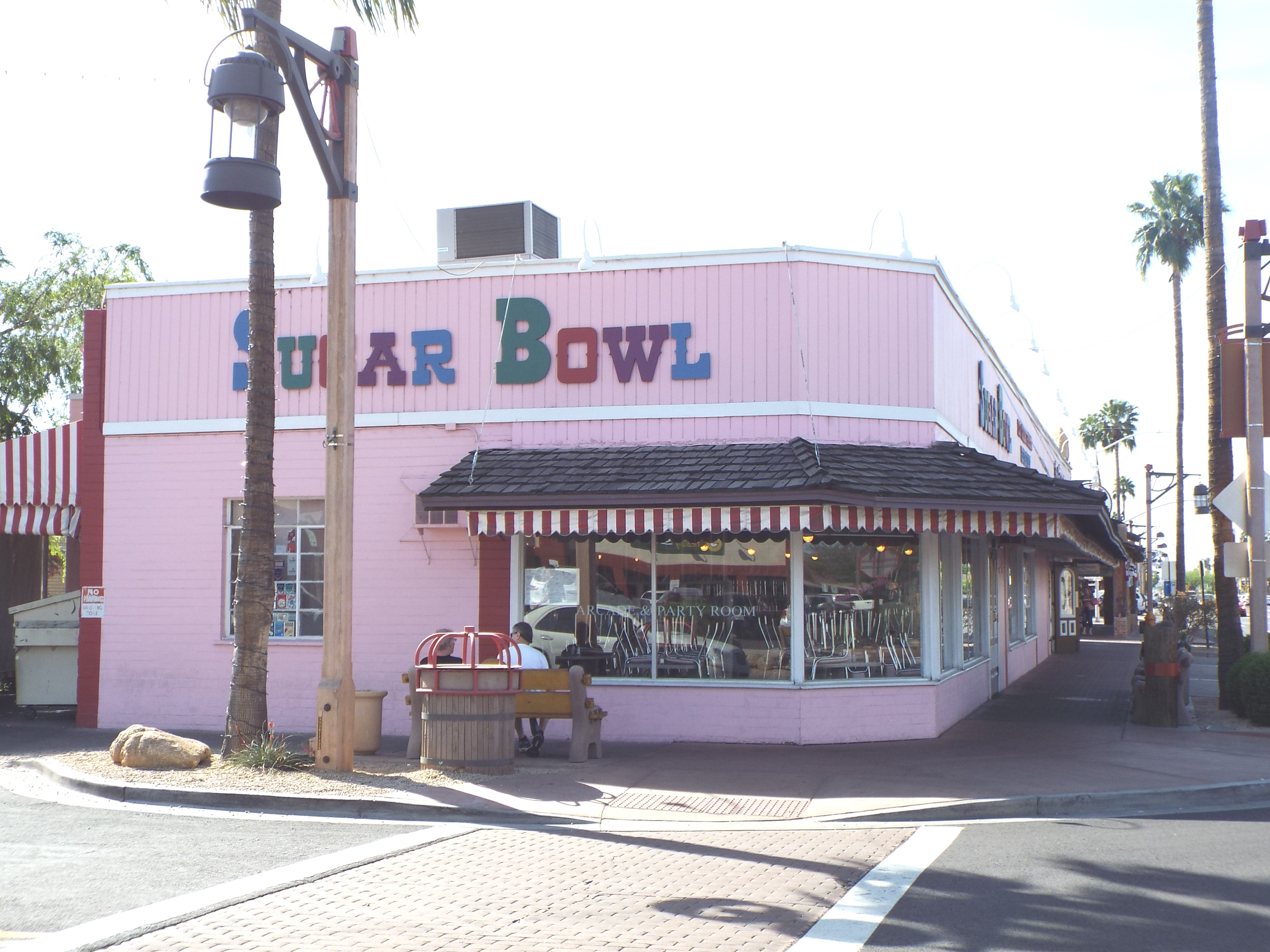
The Western Motor Service.

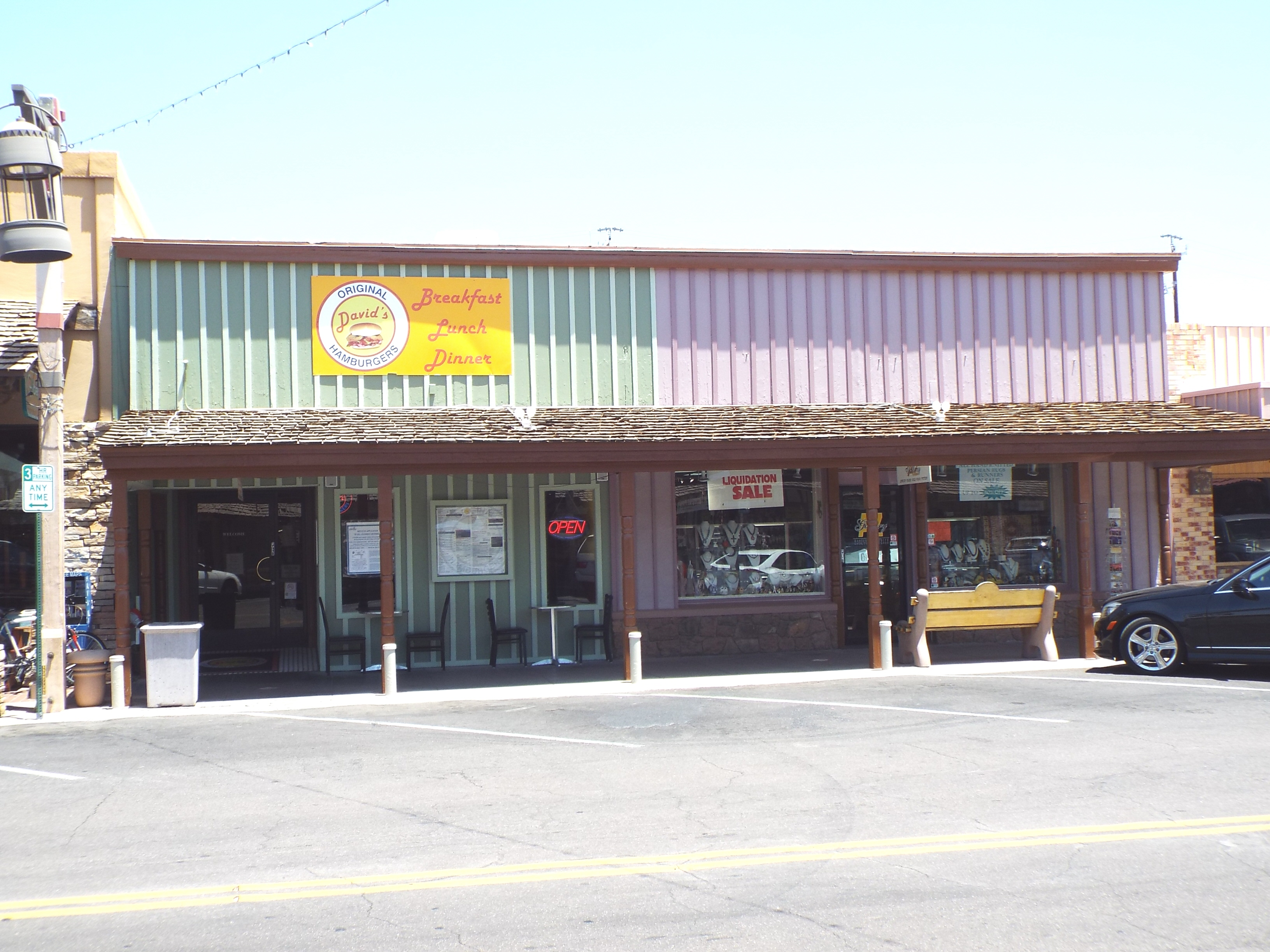
The Lu Lu Belle Building.

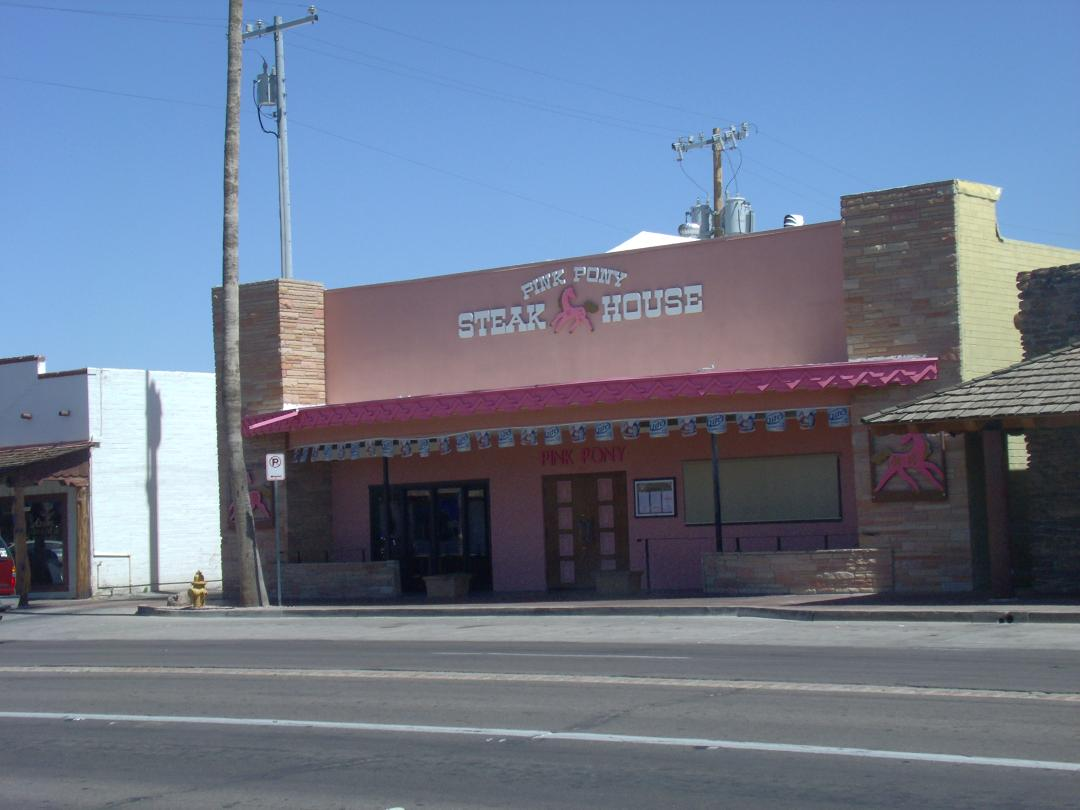
Sprouse-Reitz Drugstore.

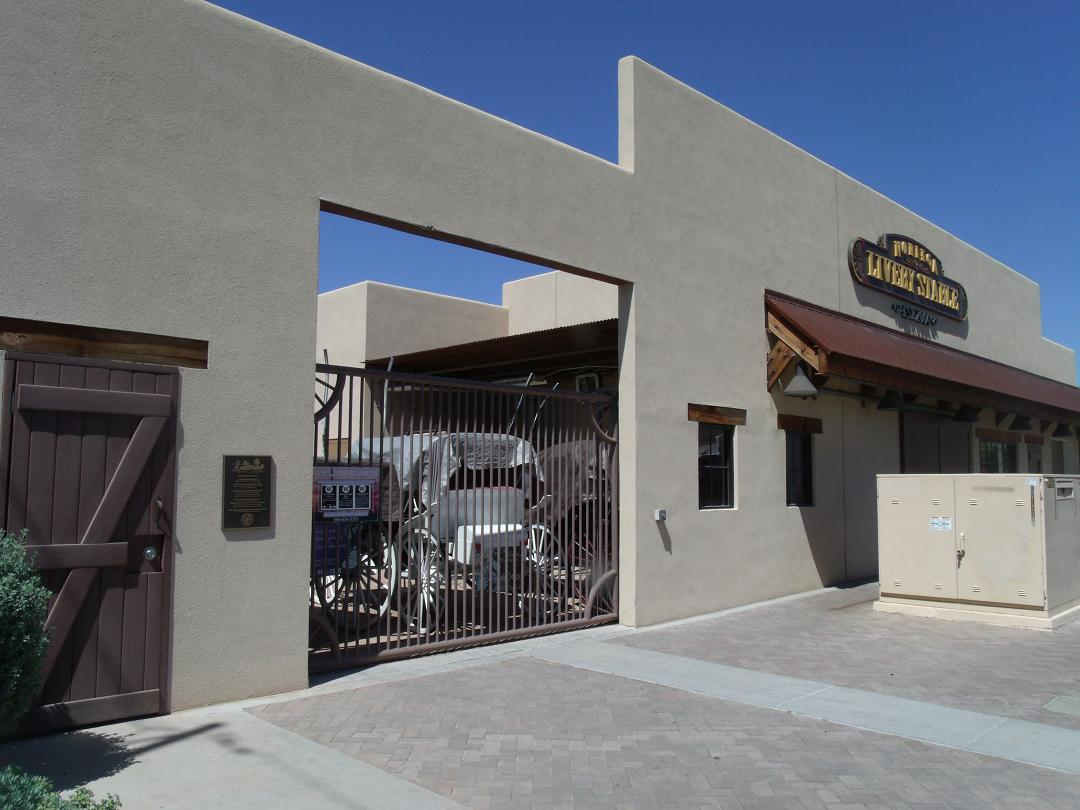
Noriega's Home and Livery Stable.

== Listings in historic registers ==
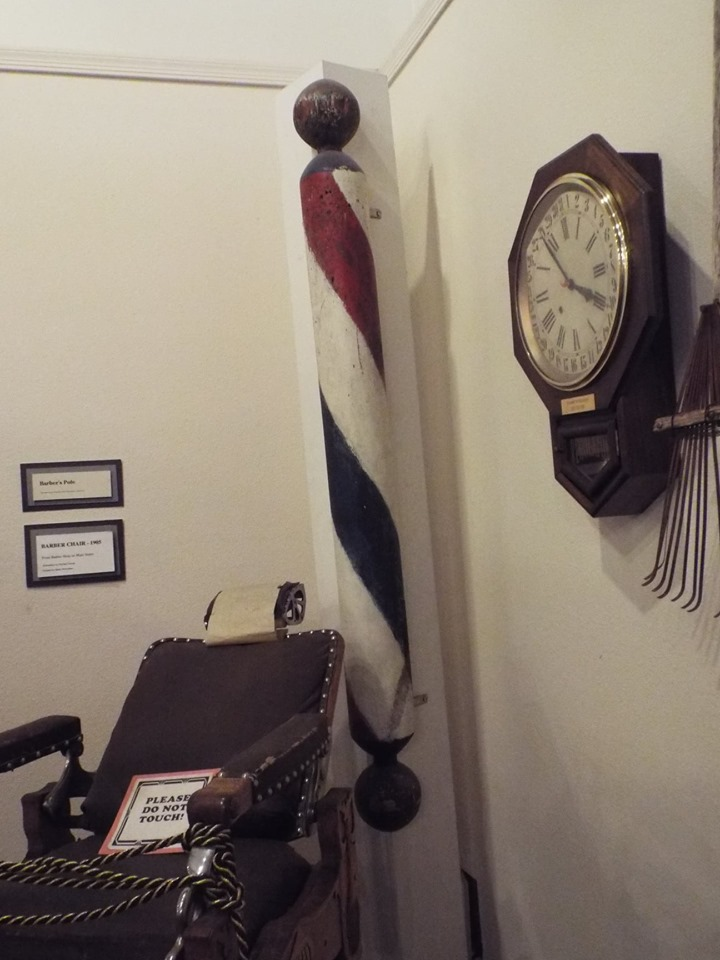
1905 Barber's pole

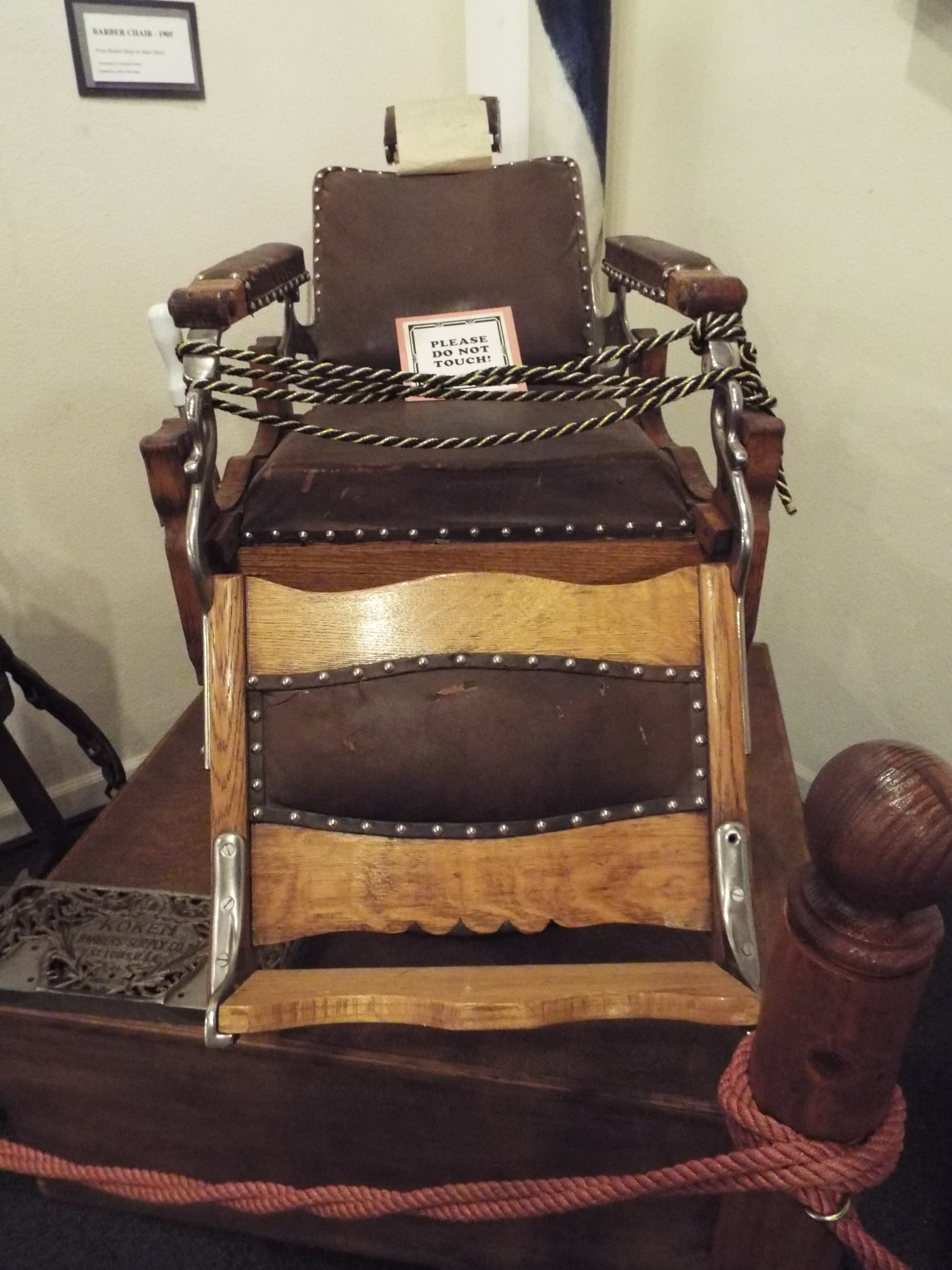
1905 Main Street Barber Shop's chair

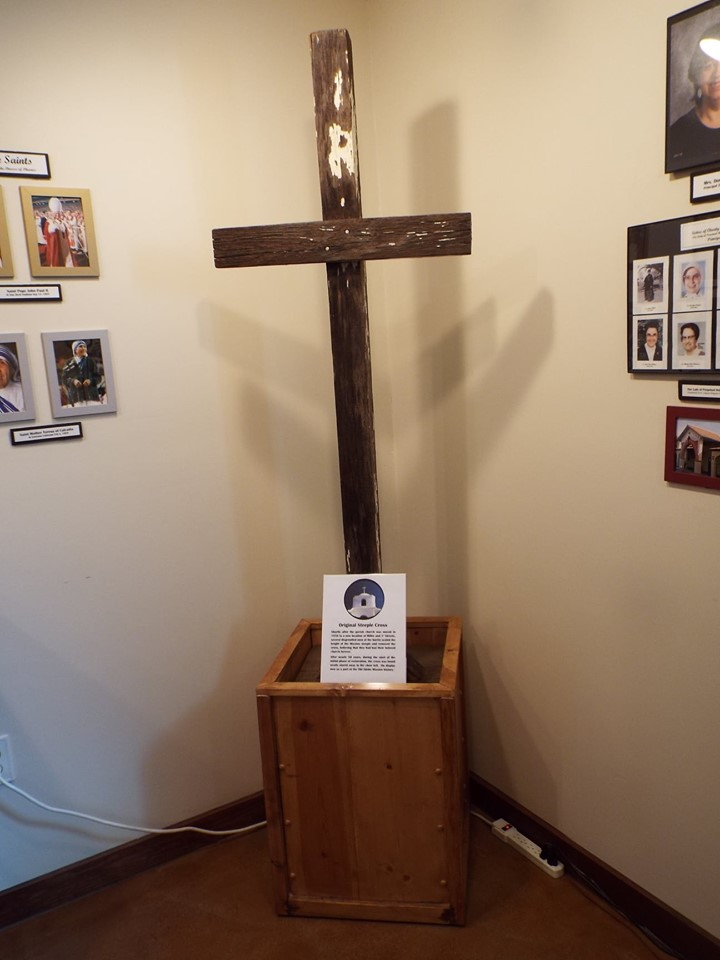
The original 1933 Our Lady of Perpetual Help Church steeple cross

The following photographs are of some of the historic structures in Scottsdale listed in the National Register of Historic Places National Register of Historic Places and/or Scottsdale's Historic Register. A brief description of the images is also included.

- The Frank Tilus House was built in 1875 and is located at 1319 N Hayden Road. The house was added to the National Register of Historic Places in 1982, reference: #82002086.
- The Charles Miller House in Old Town Scottsdale was built in 1913 and is located at 6938 E. 1st Street. Date placed on Scottsdale Historic Register: February 16, 2010 by Ordinance No.3886, 11-ZN-2009.
- The George Ellis House was built in 1925 and is located at 105 Cattle Track Road. It was listed in the National Register of Historic Places on September 3, 1999, reference: #99001065.
- The Louise Lincoln Kerr House was built in 1925 and located at 6110 N. Scottsdale Road. Kerr was a benefactor of musical institutions in the Valley, including the Phoenix Symphony and the ASU School of Music. The house was listed in the National Register of Historic Places on April 14, 2010, reference: #10000173.
- The Walter Winchell House was built in 1954 and located at 6116 (now 6118) E. Yucca Street. Walter Winchell was a newspaper columnist credited with inventing the gossip column.
- The Scottsdale Grammar School, a.k.a. "The Little Red Schoolhouse". The school house was built in 1909 and is located at E' Scottsdale Mall (E. Main Street). The school was added to the National Register of Historic Places in 1994, reference: #94000571.
- The Scottsdale Grammar School #2 a.k.a. Loloma Elementary was built in 1928 and is located on the corner of N. Marshall Way & E. 2nd Street. It is listed in the Scottsdale Historic Register.
- The Cattle Track Complex. The complex was built during the period of 1937 to 1940. It is located at 6105-6207 N. Cattle Track Road. It is listed in the Scottsdale Historic Register.
- The Valley Field Riding and Polo Club of Scottsdale, Arizona, was built in 1924. It is located 2530 N. 64 St. The property is located within the premises of a private gated community and is in a total state of abandonment. It was listed in the National Register of Historic Places in 2009, reference number 08001405.
- The Adobe Apartments were built in 1953 and are located at 7037-7042 E 1st Avenue. It is listed in the Scottsdale Historic Register.
- Craftsman Court was developed during the period of 1955 to 1958. It is located at N. Craftsman Court & N. 5th Ave. It is listed in the Scottsdale Historic Register.
- The Hotel Valley Ho was built during the period of 1956 to 1958. It is located at 6850 E Main Street. It is listed in the Scottsdale Historic Register.
- The Nuss Building was built in 1960 and is located at 4419 N. Scottsdale Road and Shoeman Lane in downtown Scottsdale. The historic building, though it houses various small businesses, is partially vacant.
- The Winfield Place Apartments (now the Winfield Place Condominium). On June 29, 1978, actor Bob Crane of Hogan's Heroes fame was murdered in apartment 132A of the complex which is located at 7430 E. Chaparral Road. A funeral wreath hangs on the door of the apartment.
- The Camelback Inn was built in 1936. The Inn is located at 5402 East Lincoln Drive. Also pictured is the original Rita's Kitchen dining room in of the Camelback Inn.
- The Camelback Inn Chapel which was built in 1936.
- The Church of Jesus Christ of Latter-day Saints (LDS) was built in 1958 and is located on the southwestern corner of Earl Drive and Civic Center Plaza. It is among the 10 oldest churches in Scottsdale. The two-story church, which is now in a complete state of abandonment, once featured a prominent clock on its tower.
- The Holy Cross Lutheran Church was built in 1960 and is located at 3110 N. Hayden. It is listed in the Scottsdale Historic Register.
- The First Church of Christ, Scientist building was built in 1962 and is located at 6927 E. Indian School Road. It is listed in the Scottsdale Historic Register.
- The Glass and Garden Community Church was built in 1966 and is located at 8620 E. McDonald Road. It is listed in the Scottsdale Historic Register.
Scottsdale's properties in the National Register of Historic Places
and/or Scottsdale's Historic Register
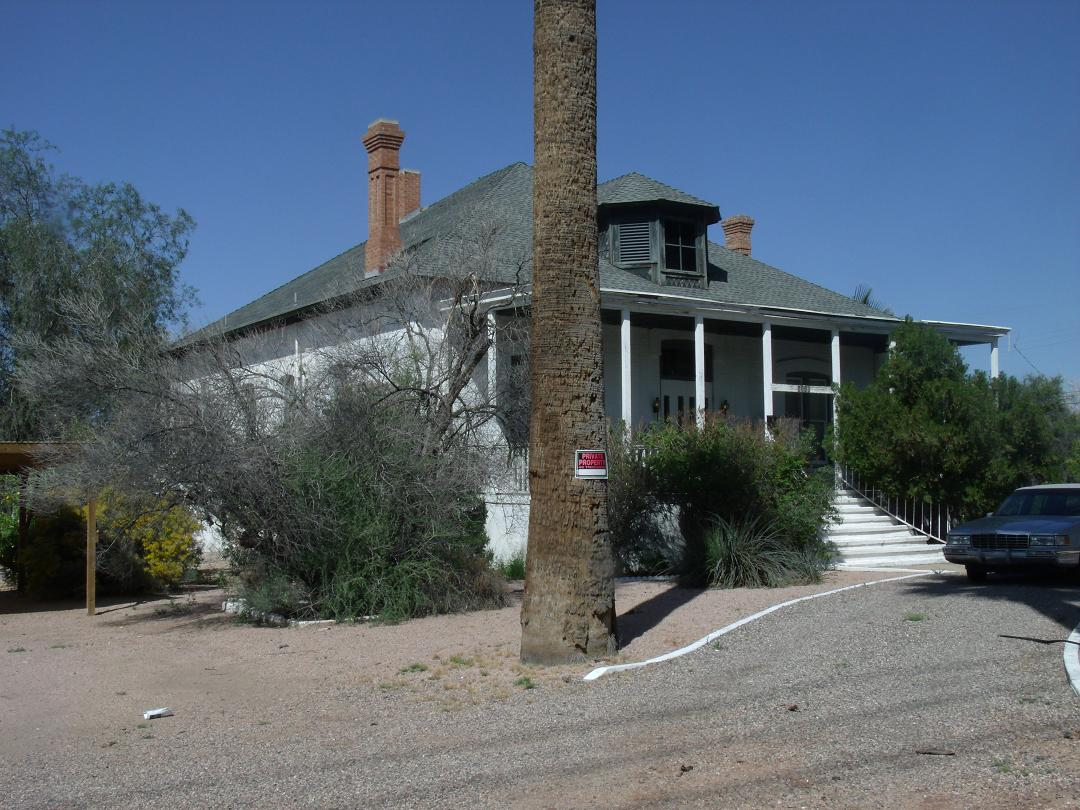
The Frank Tilus House.

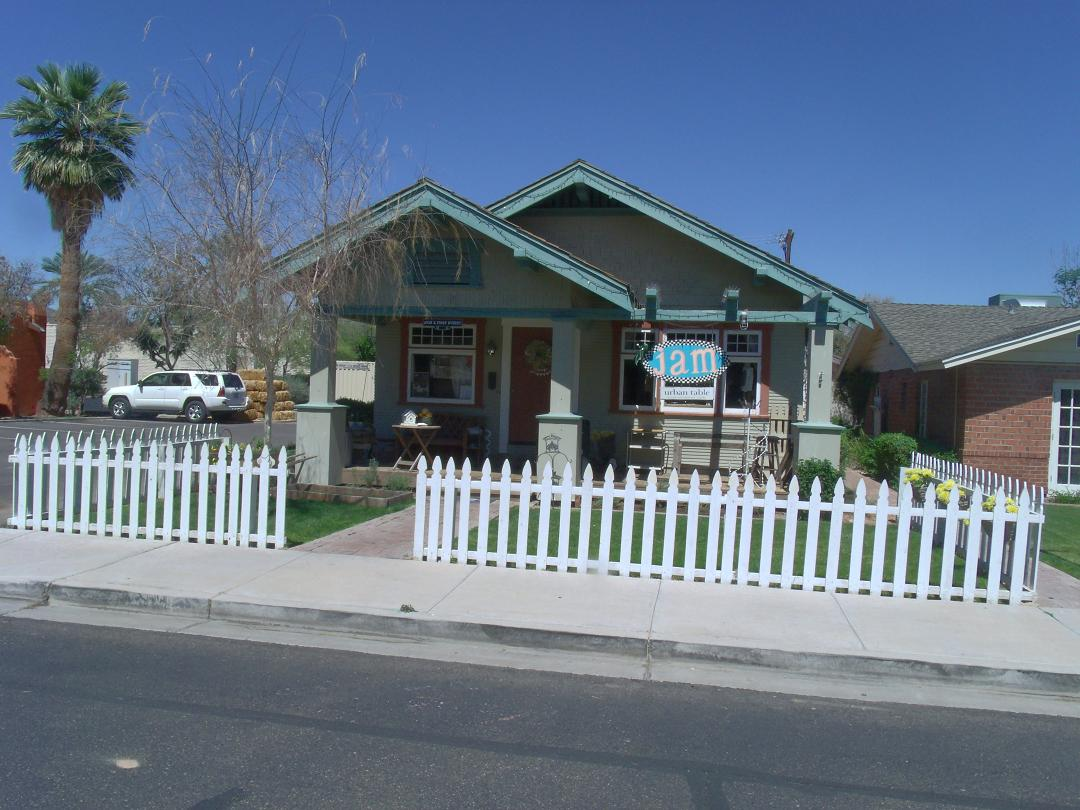
The Charles Miller House.

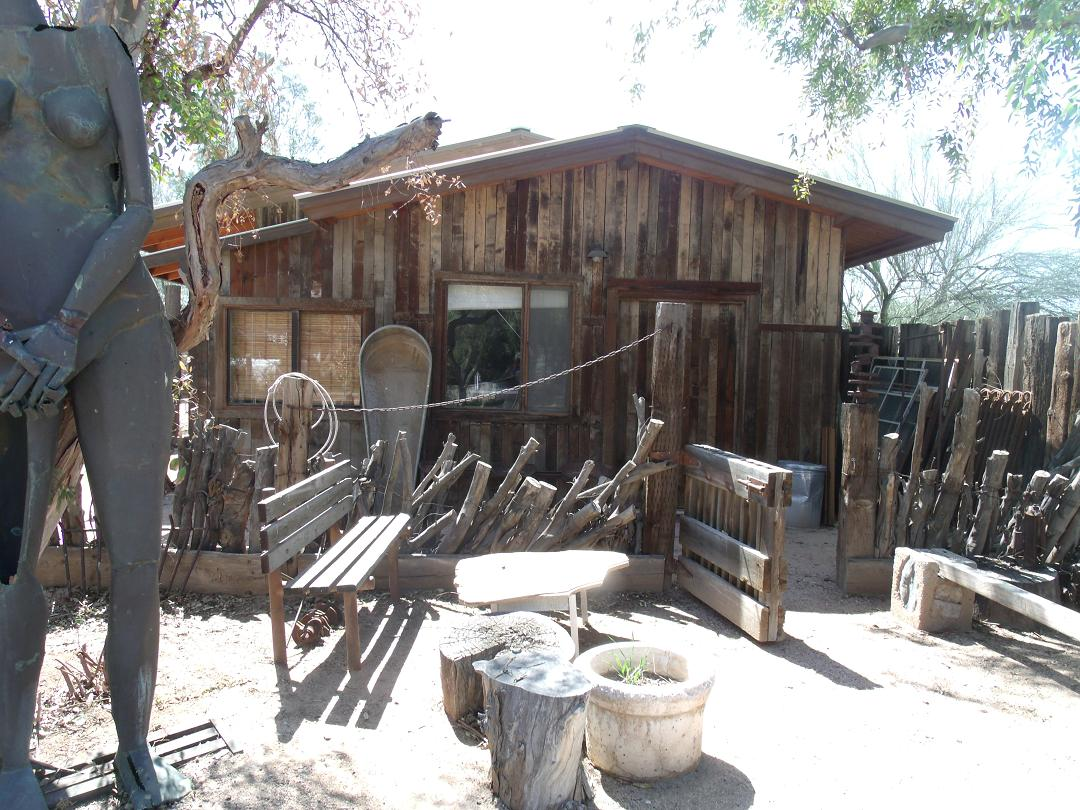
The George Ellis House.

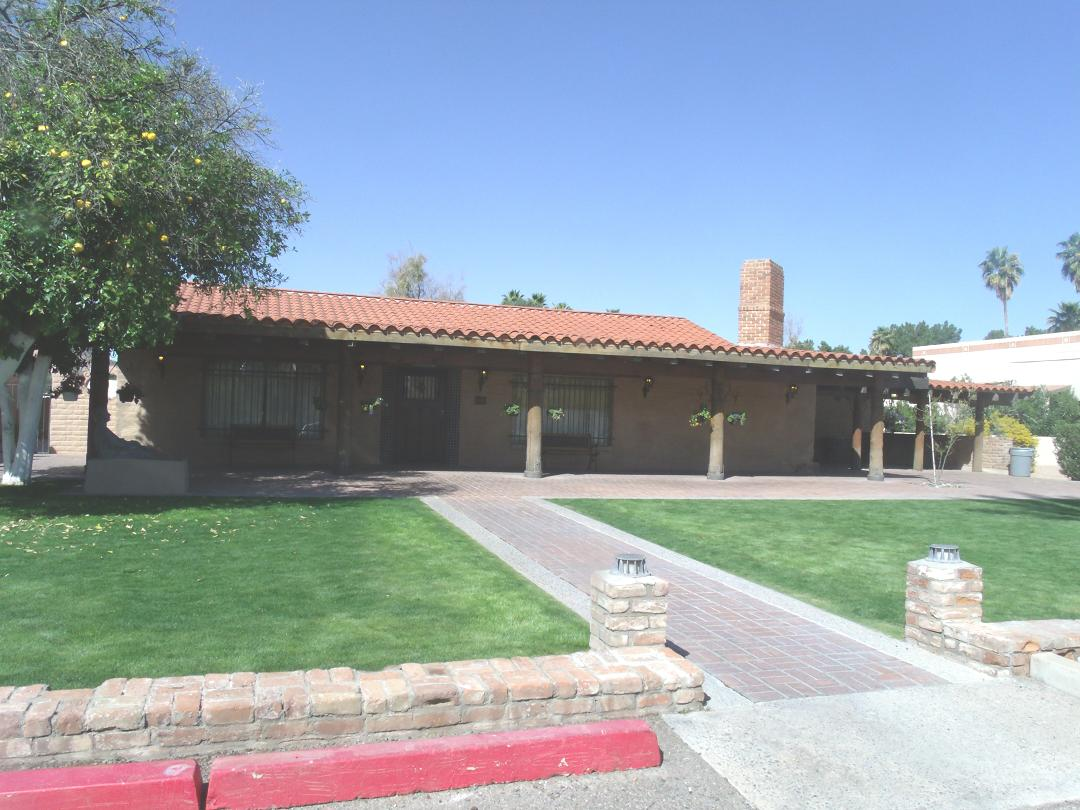
The Louise Lincoln Kerr House.

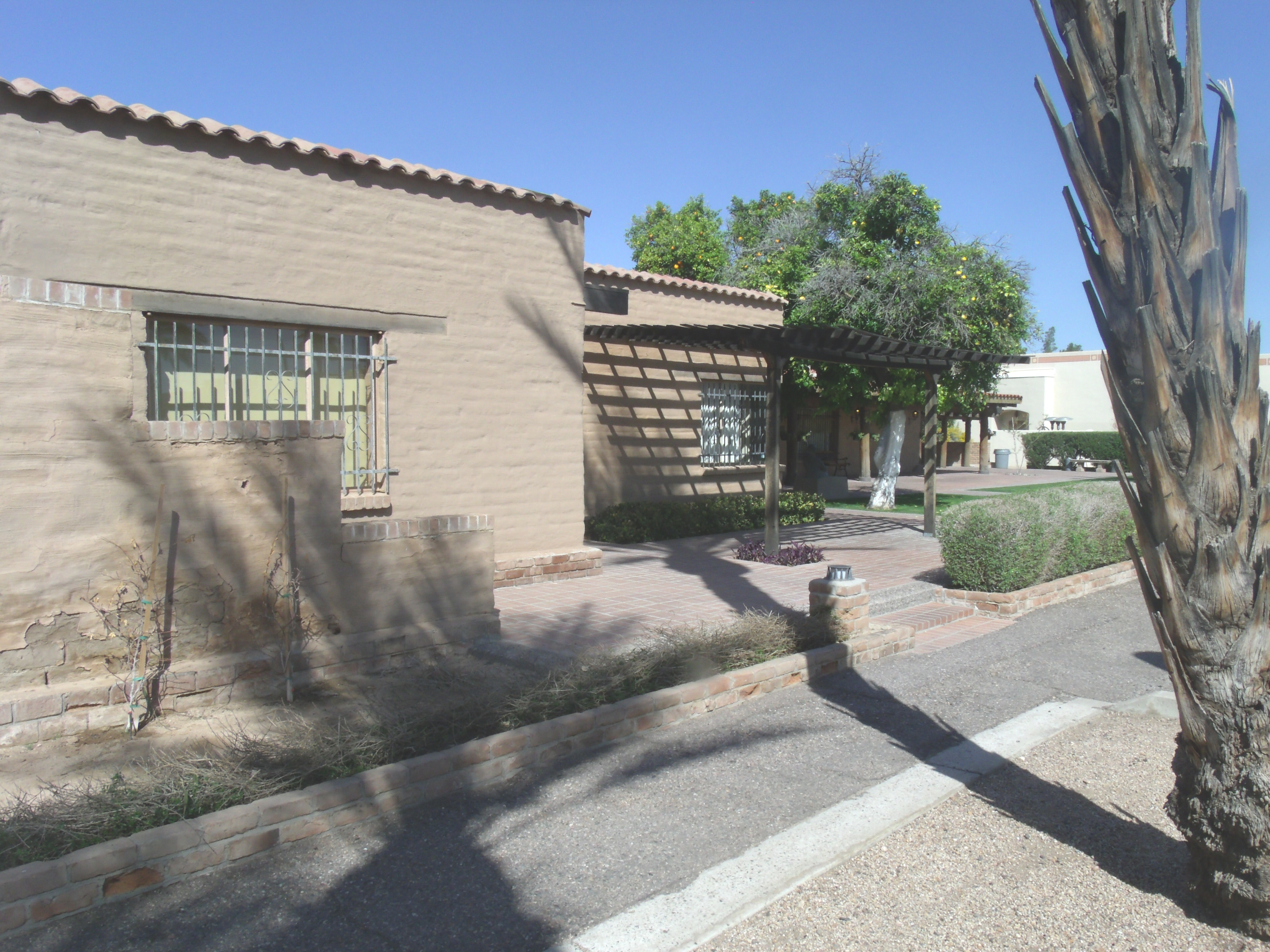
Different view of the Louise Lincoln Kerr House.

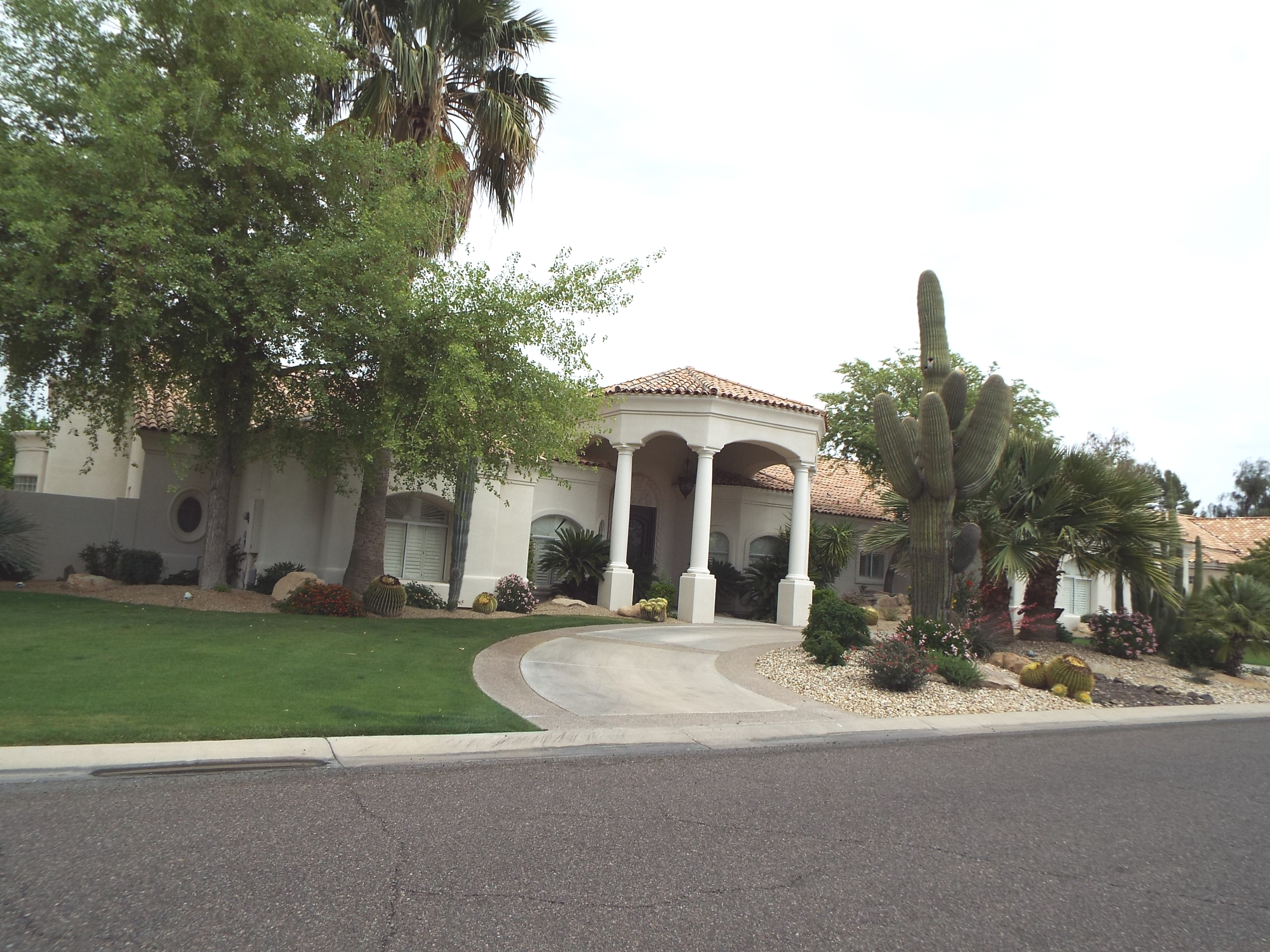
The Walter Winchell House.

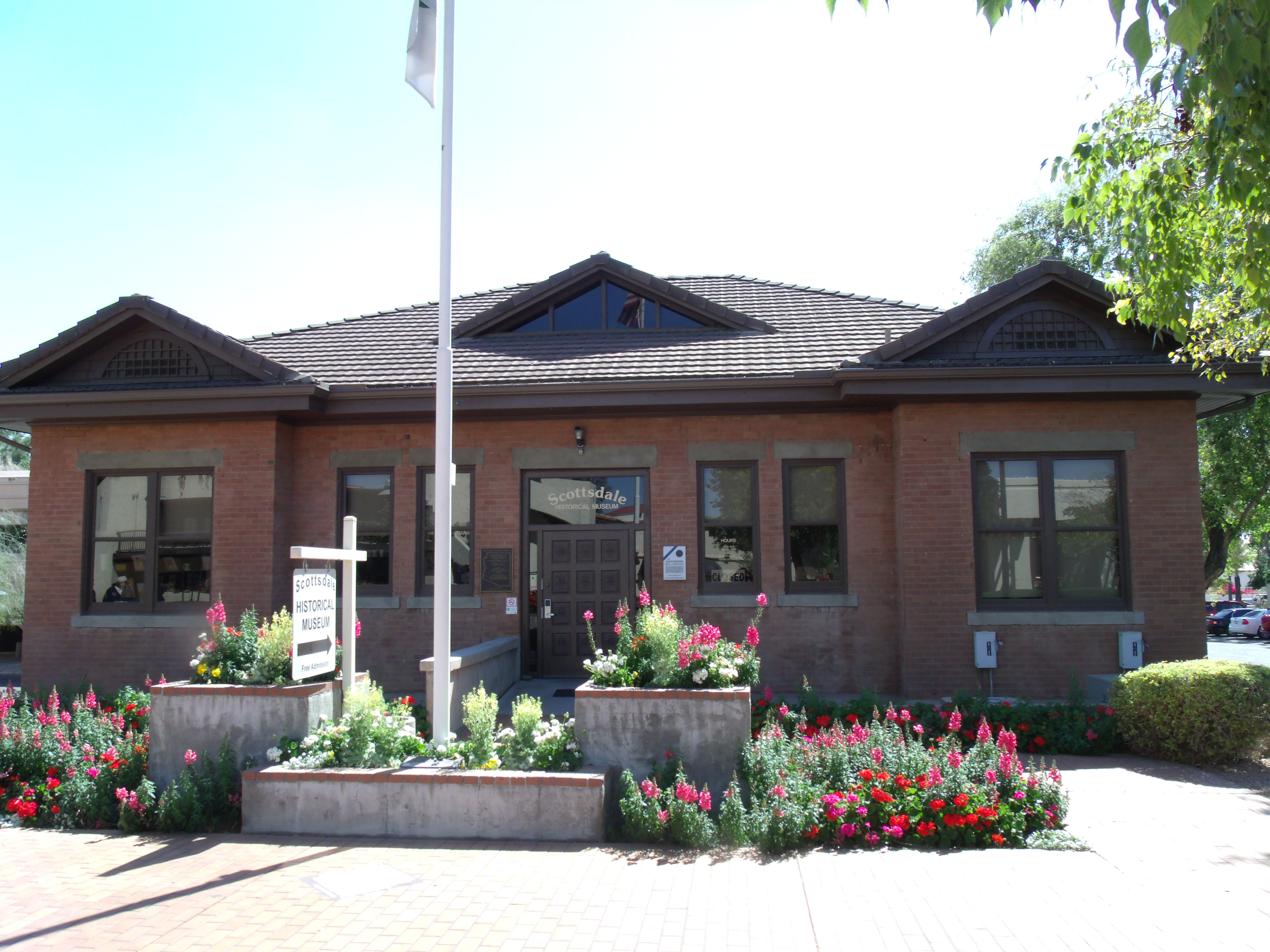
Scottsdale Grammar School, a.k.a. "The Little Red Schoolhouse".

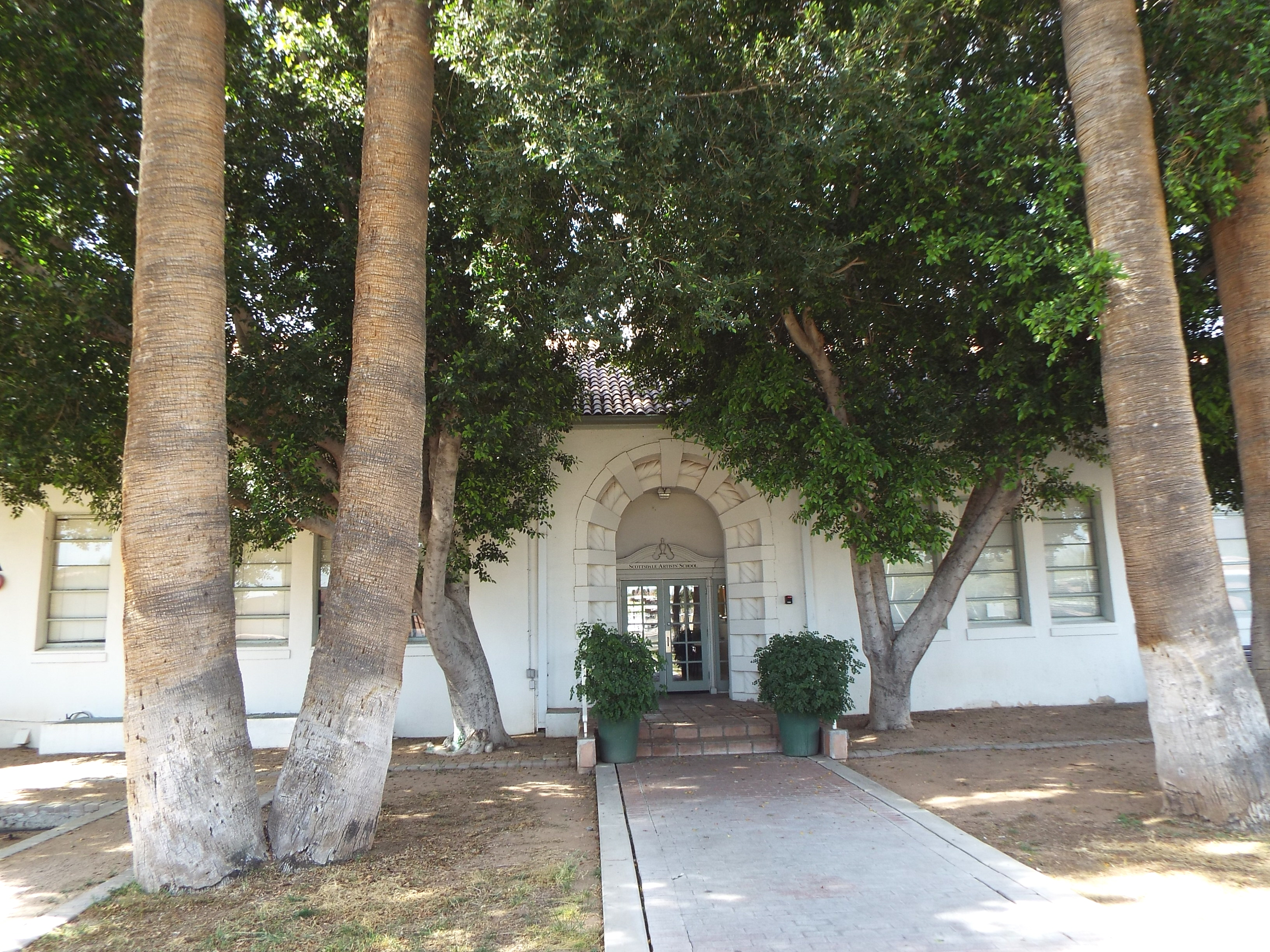
Scottsdale Grammar School #2 a.k.a. Loloma Elementary.

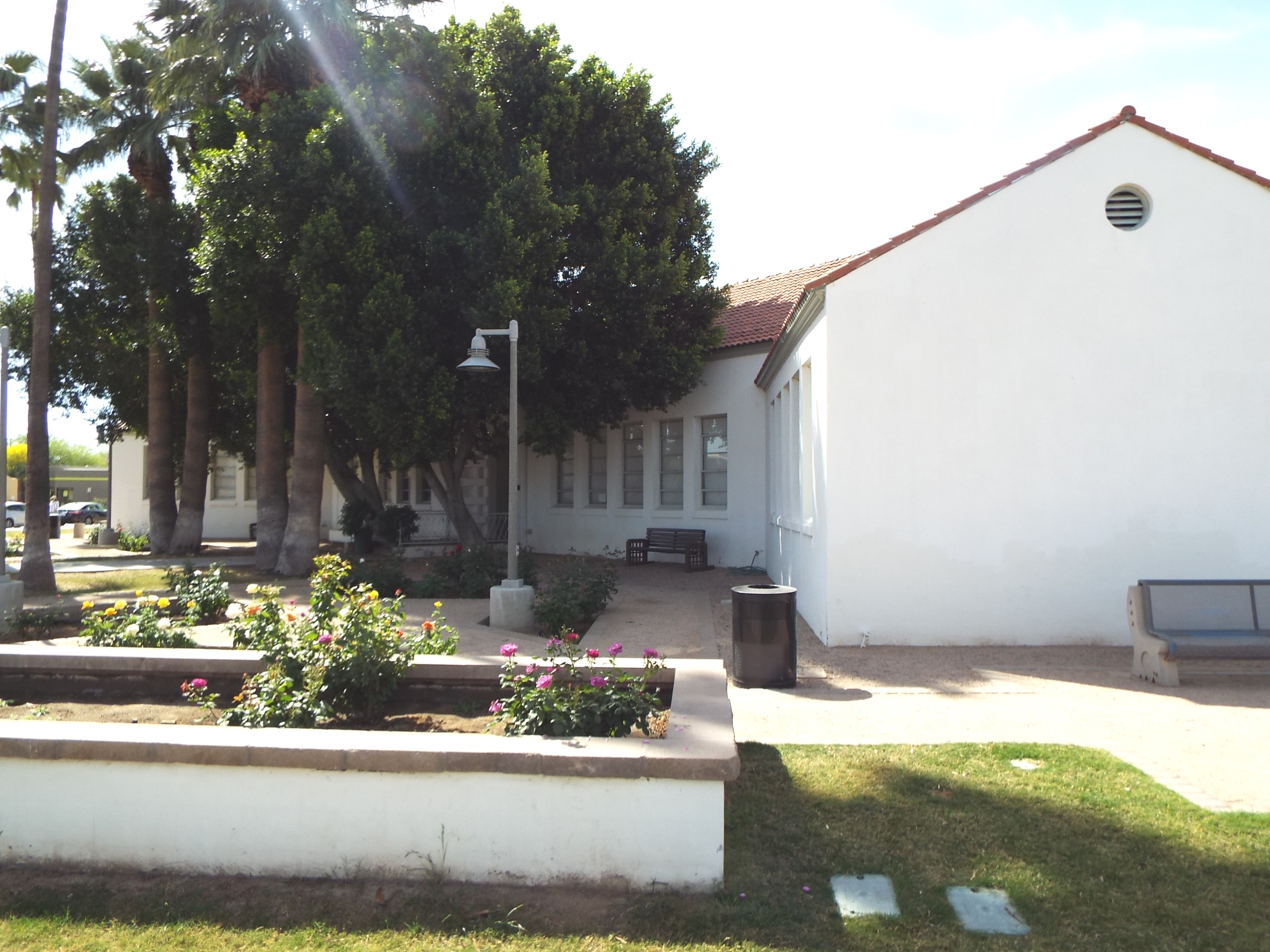
Different view of the Scottsdale Grammar School #2.

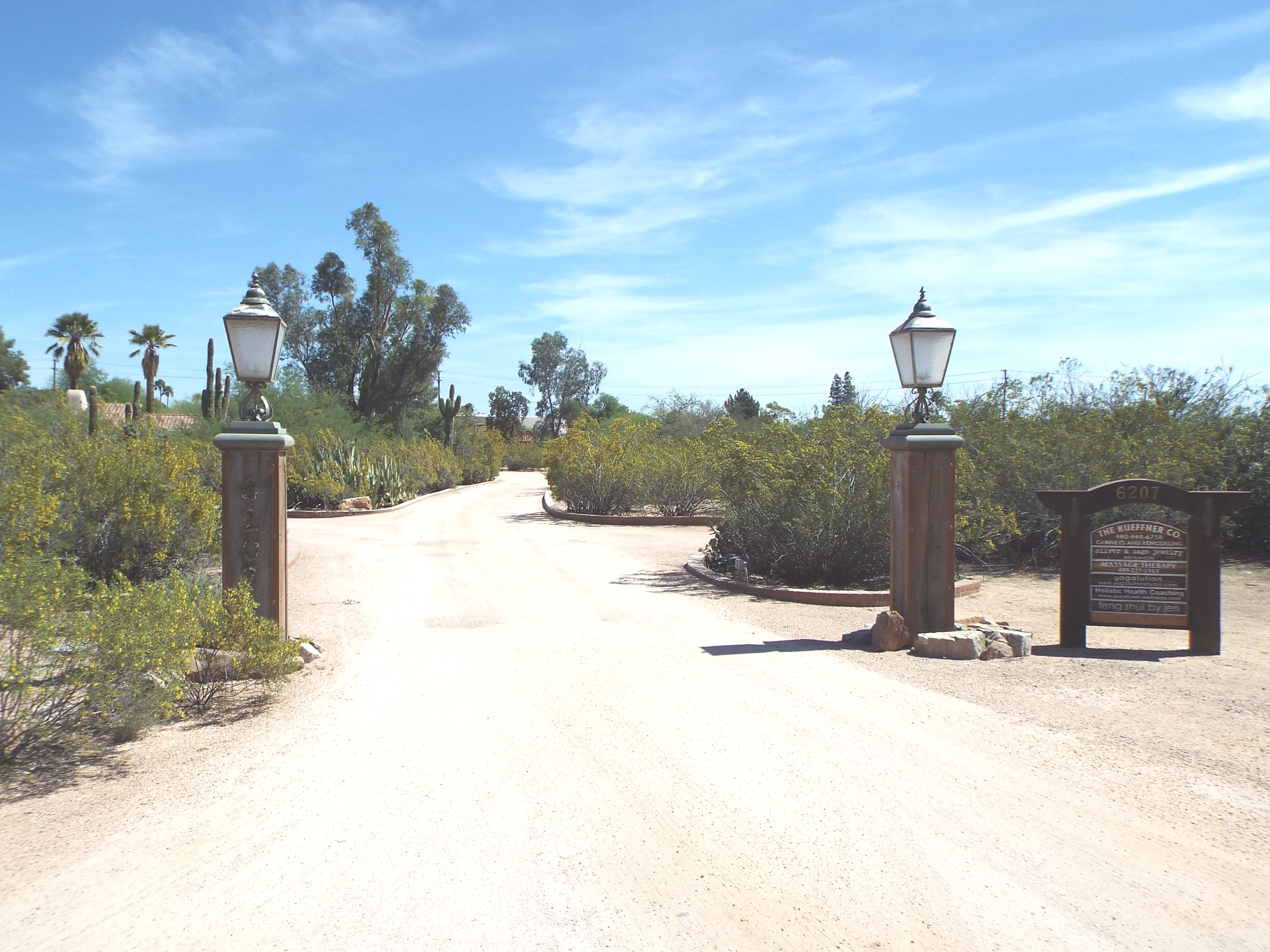
Entrance of the Cattle Track Complex.

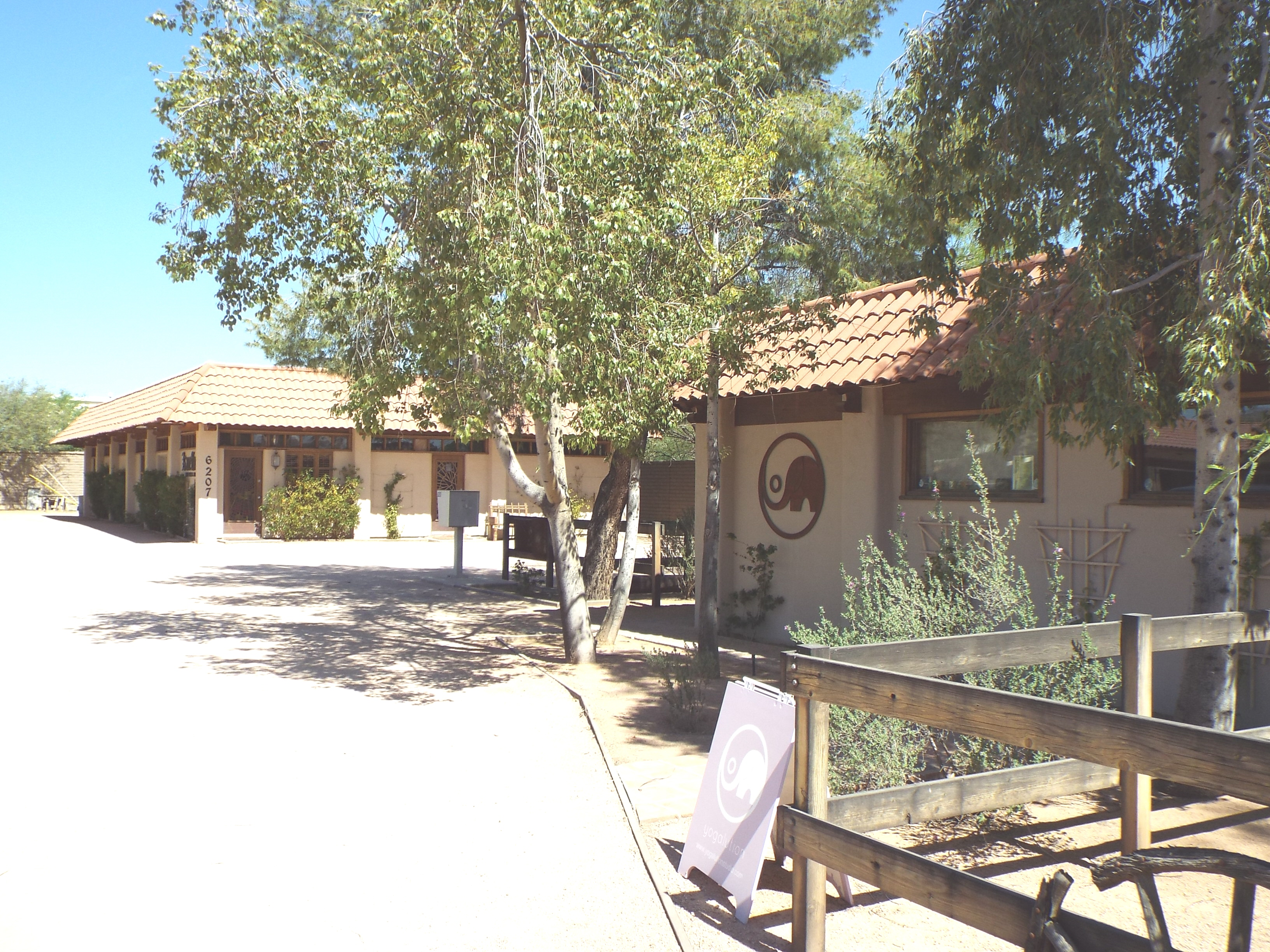
The Cattle Track Complex.

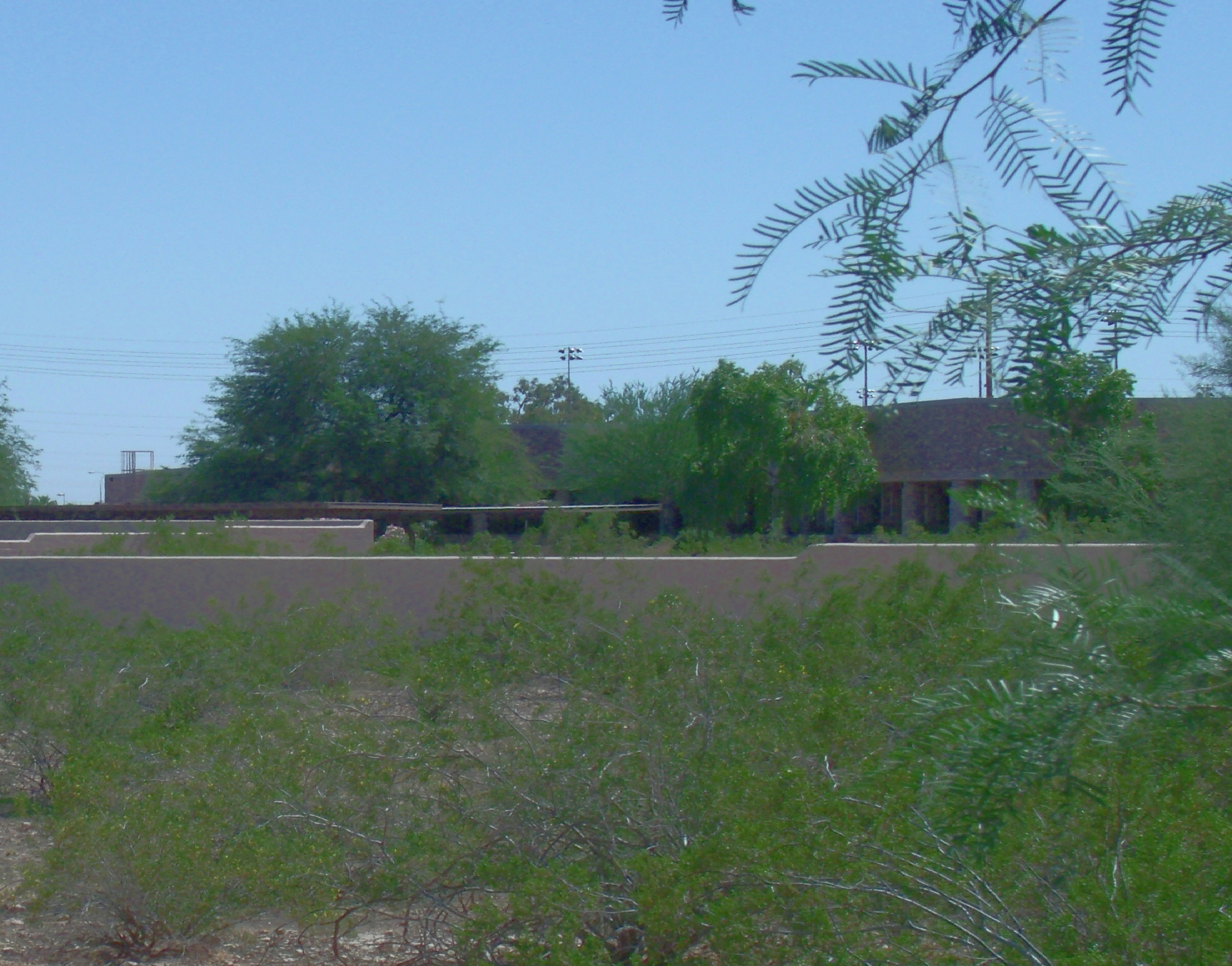
The Valley Field Riding and Polo Club.

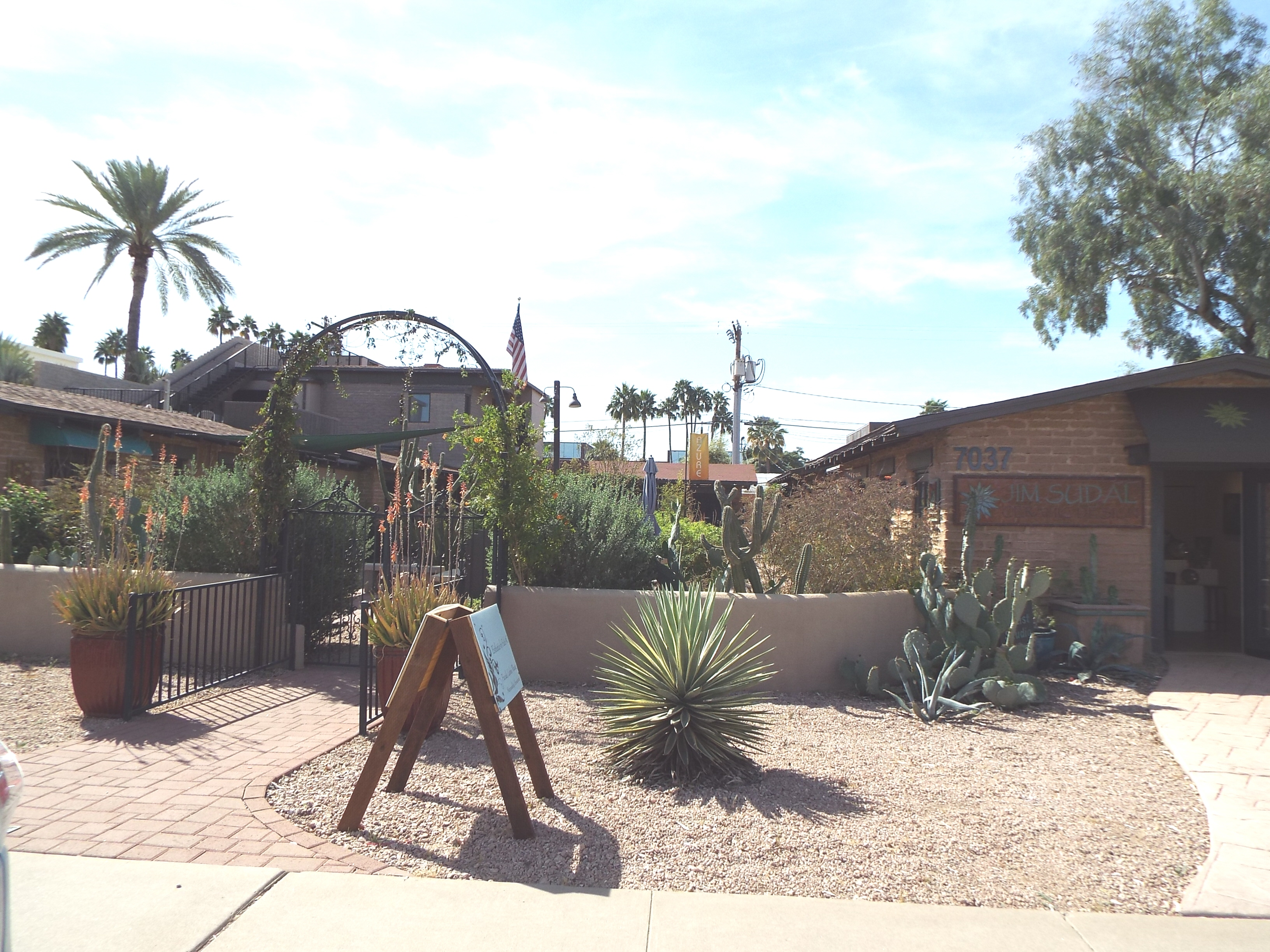
The Adobe Apartments.

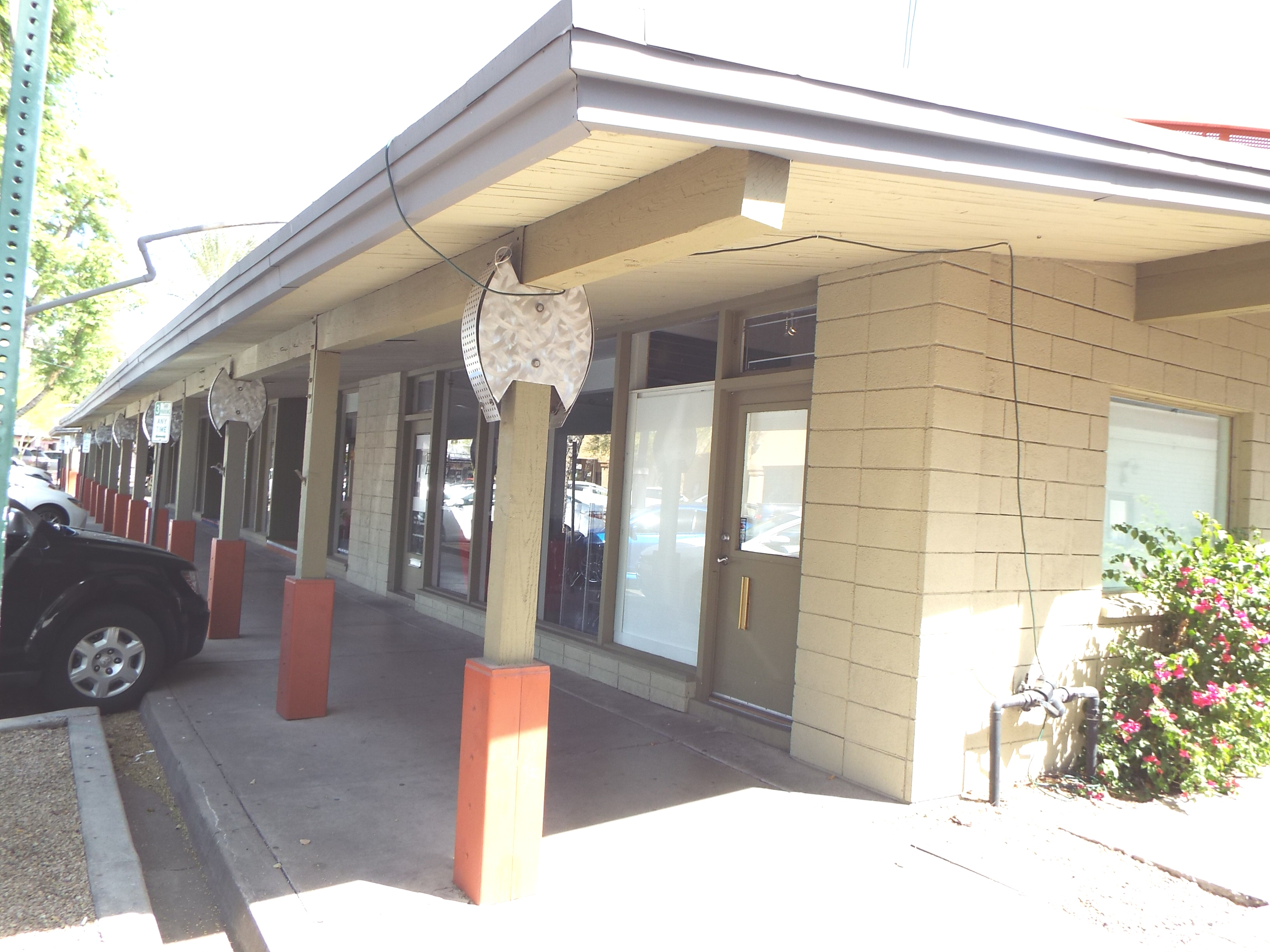
Craftsman Court.

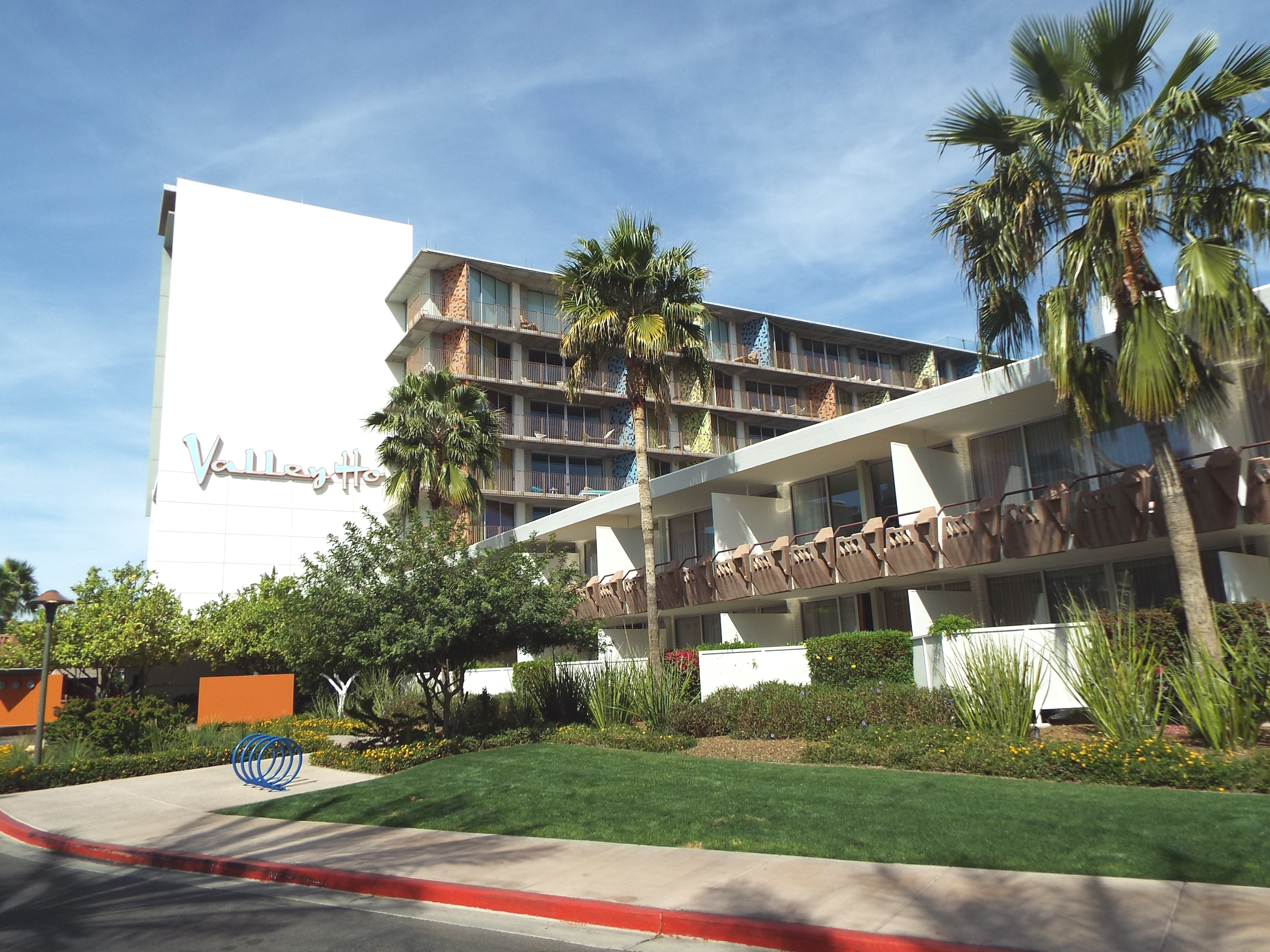
The Hotel Valley Ho.

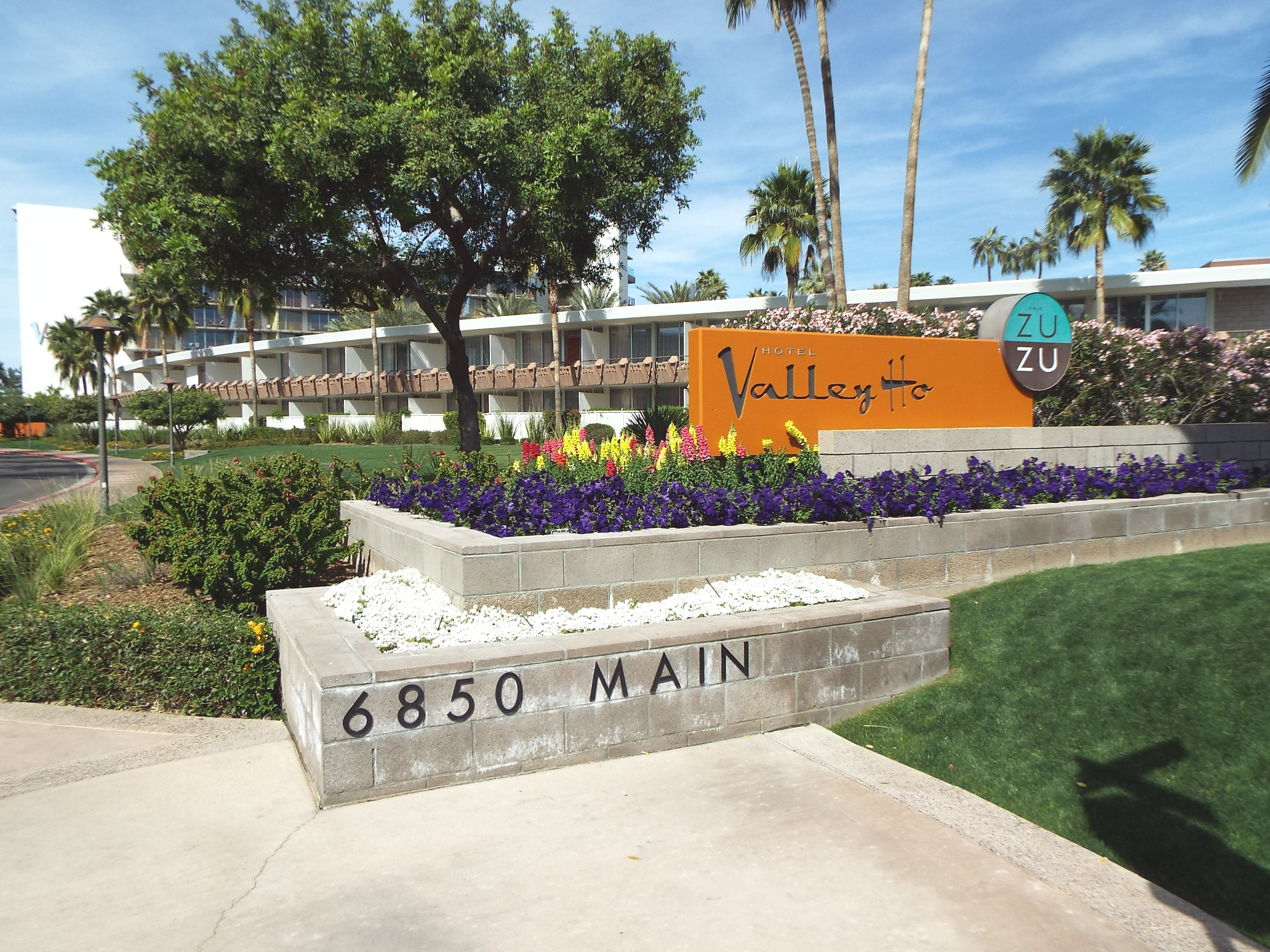
Different view of the Hotel Valley Ho.

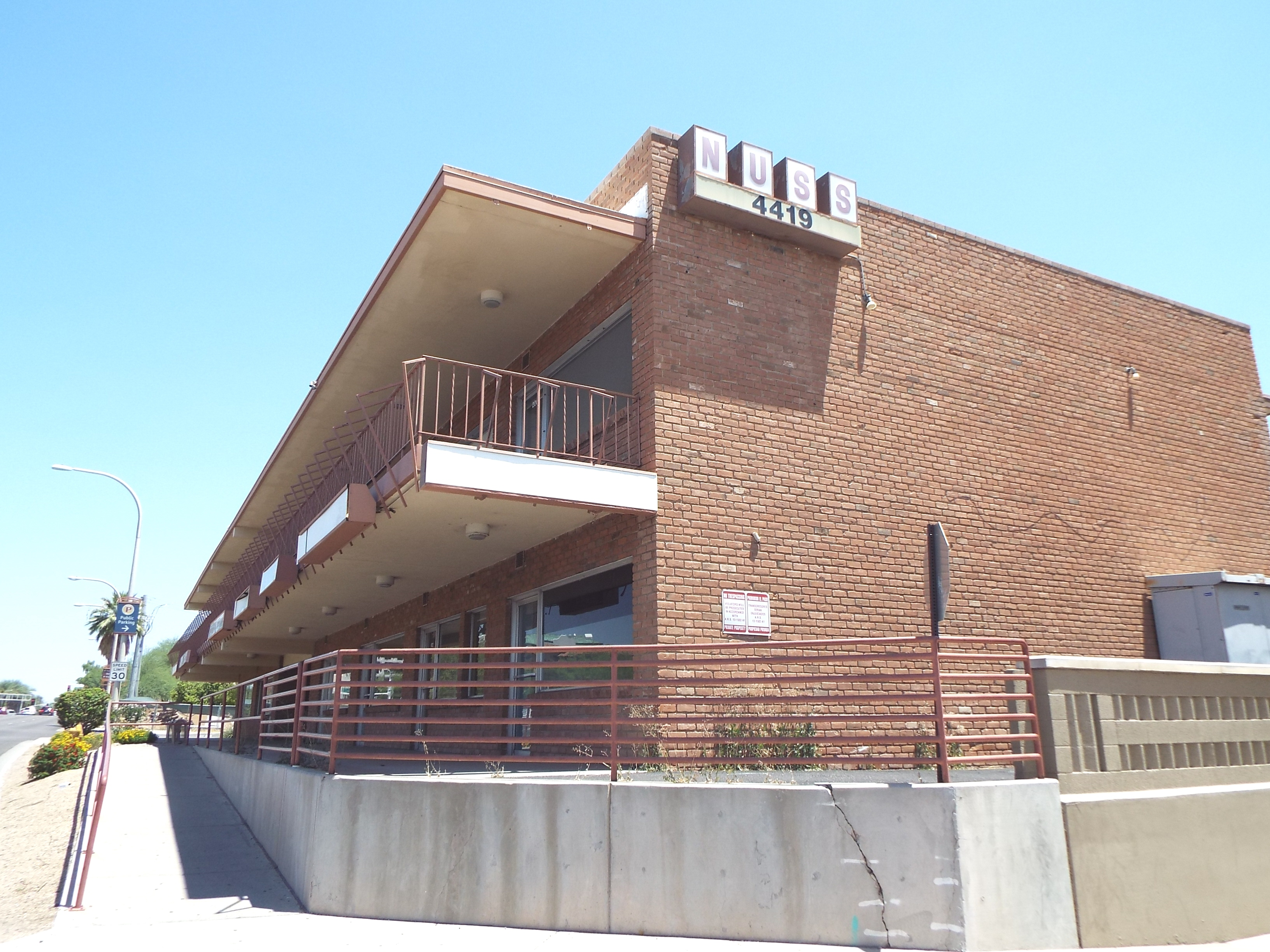
The Nuss Building.

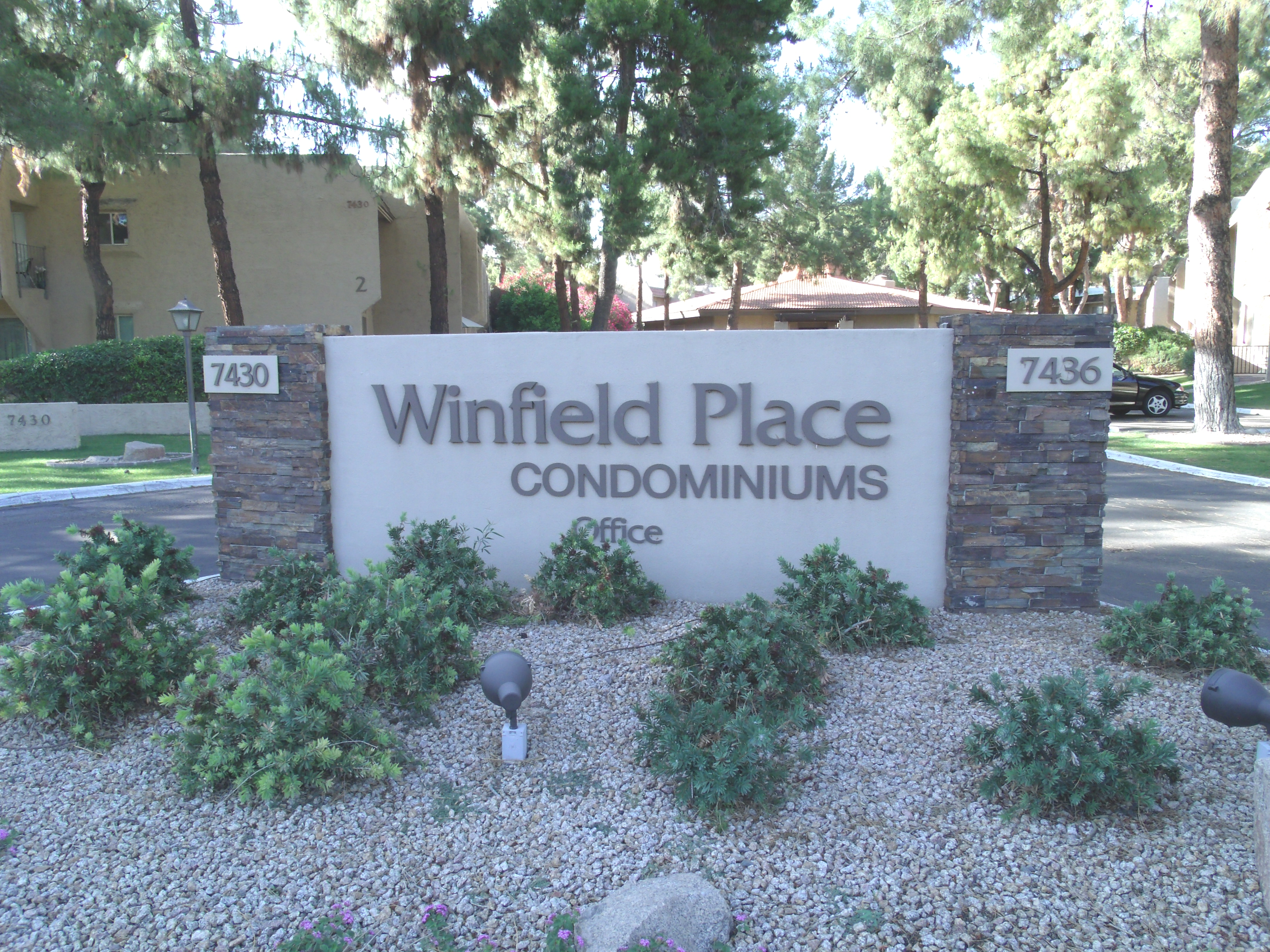
Winfield Place Apartments (now the Winfield Place Condominium).

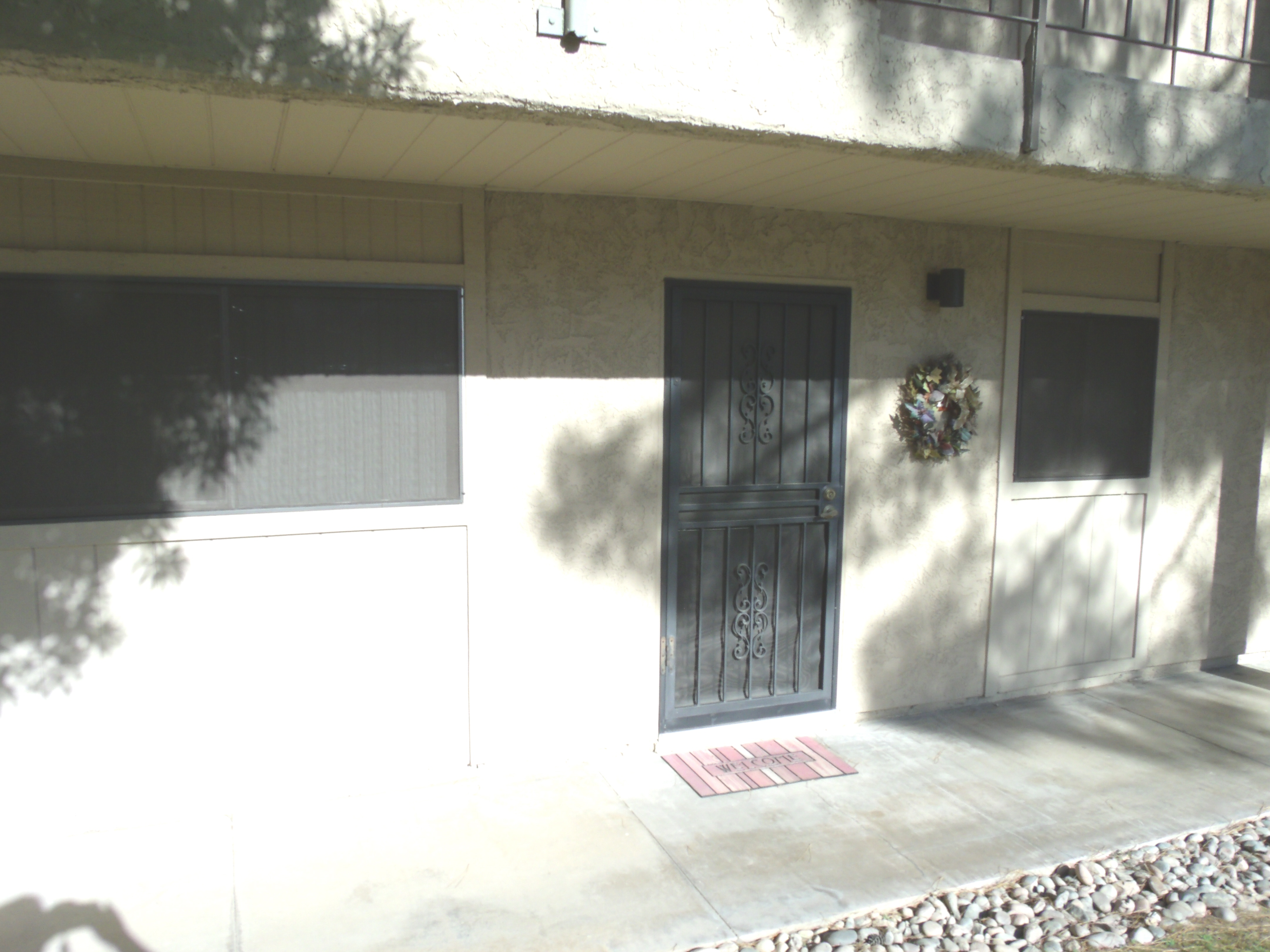
Apartment 132A of the Winfield Place Apartments.

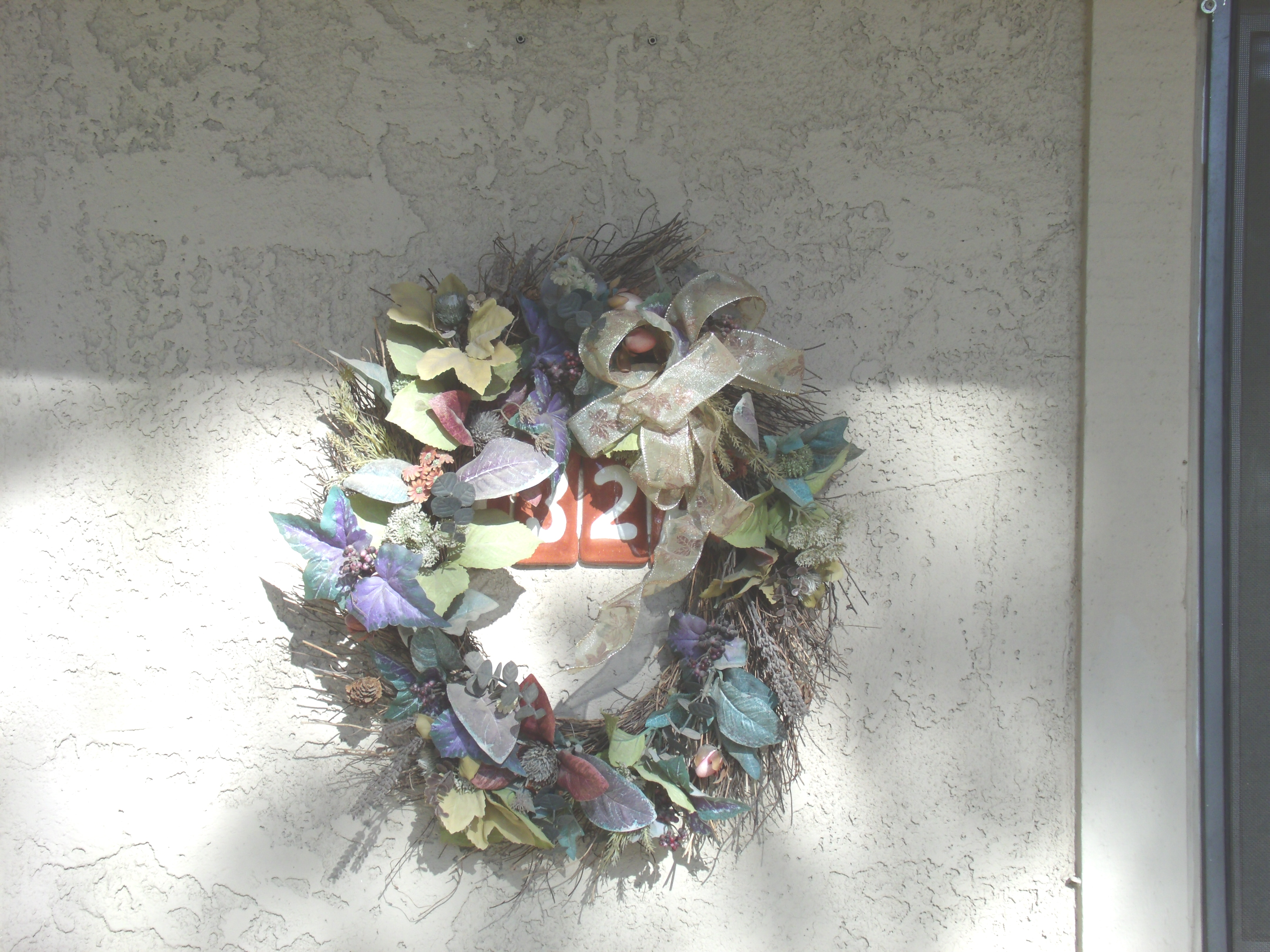
A funeral wreath on the door of apartment 132A.

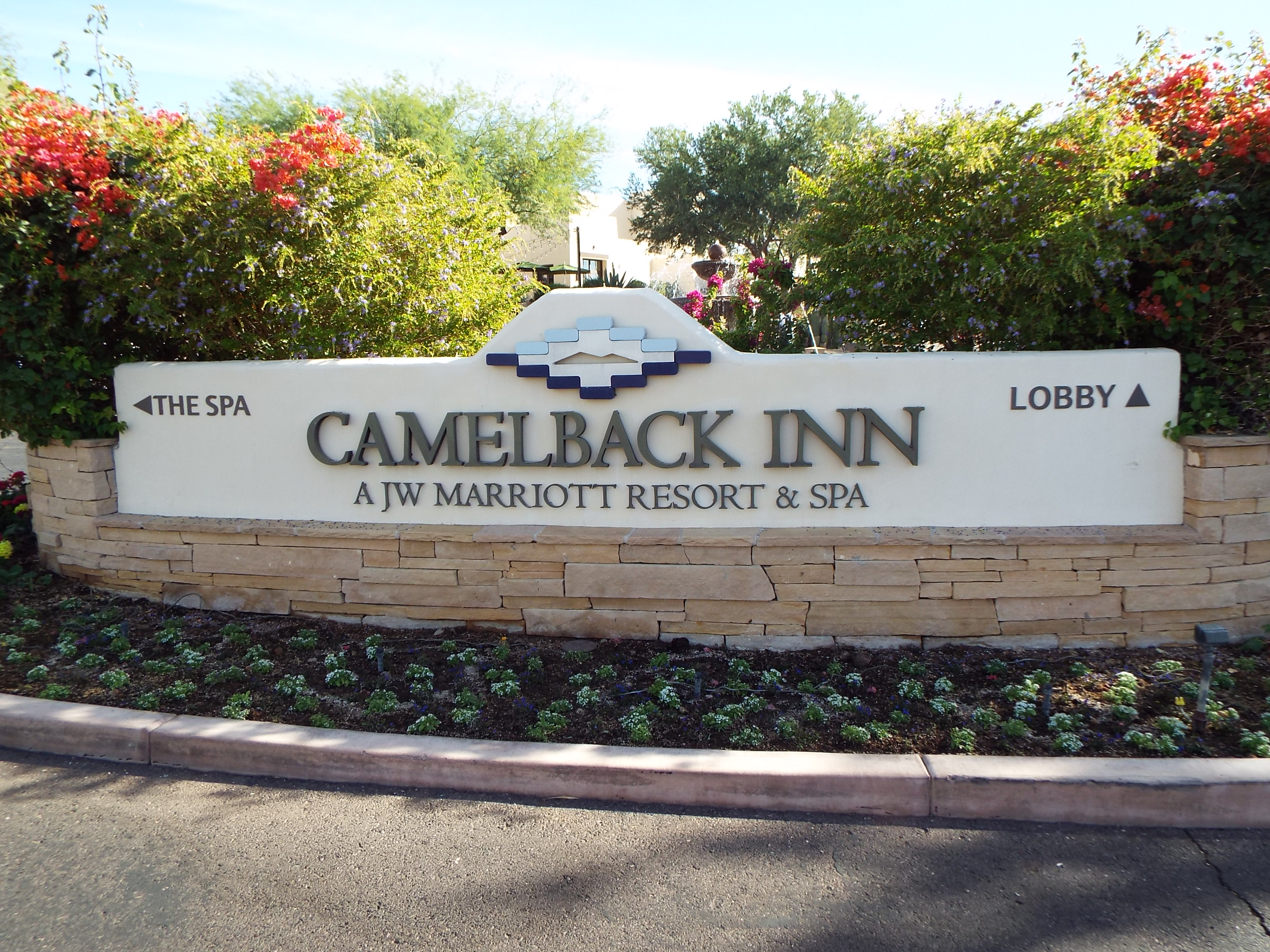
The entrance of the Camelback Inn.

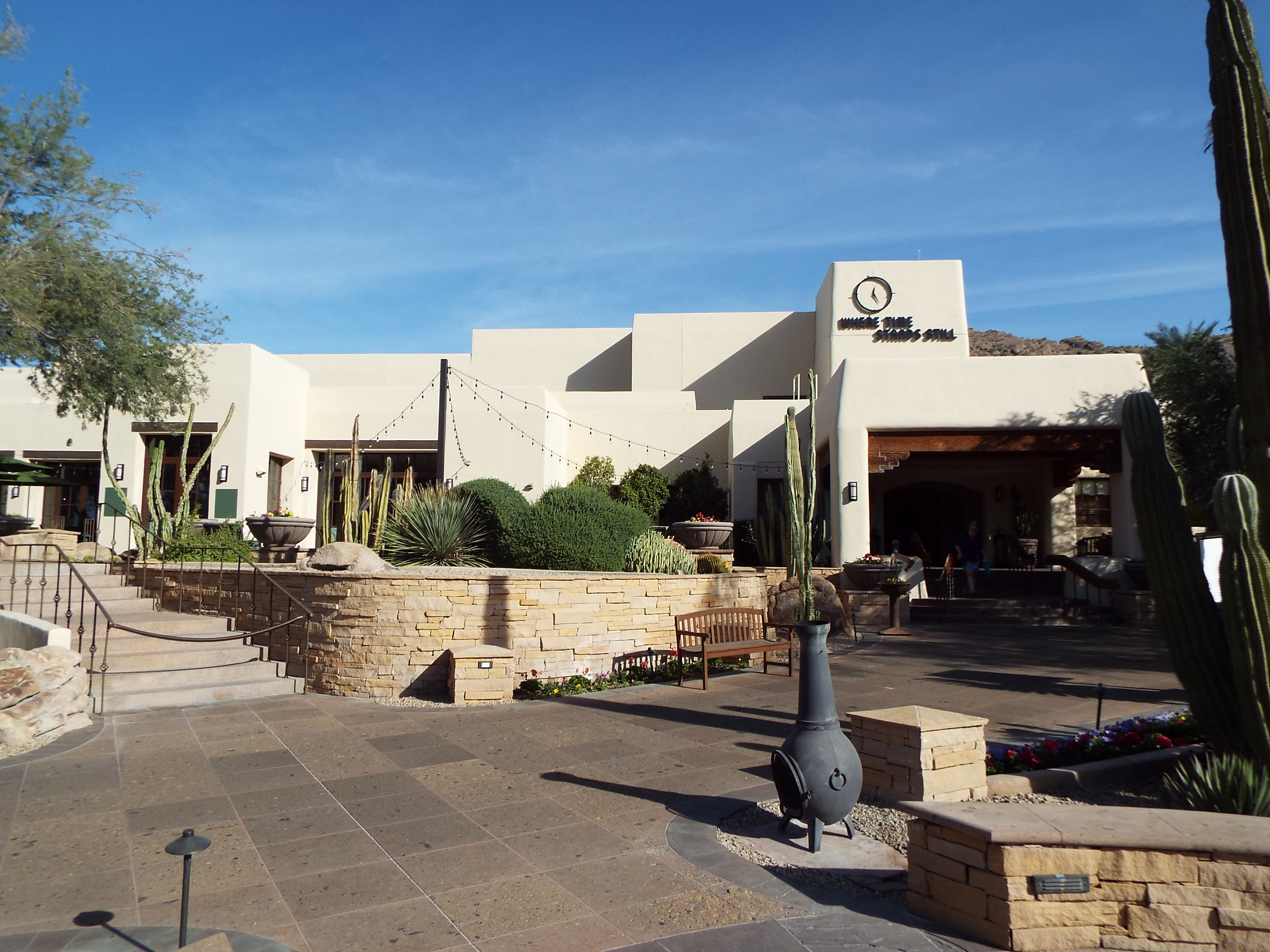
The Camelback Inn.

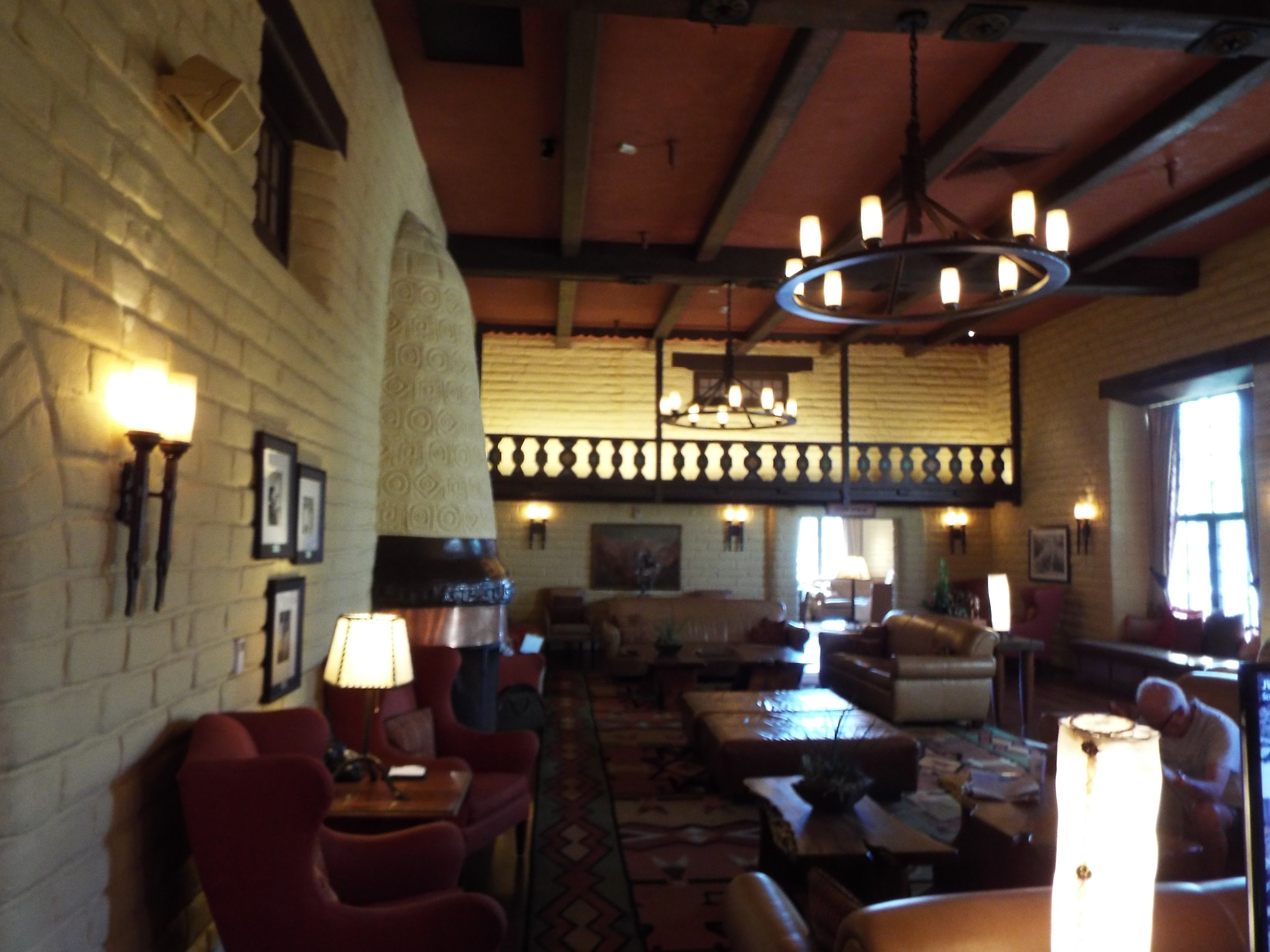
The original Rita’s Kitchen dining room.

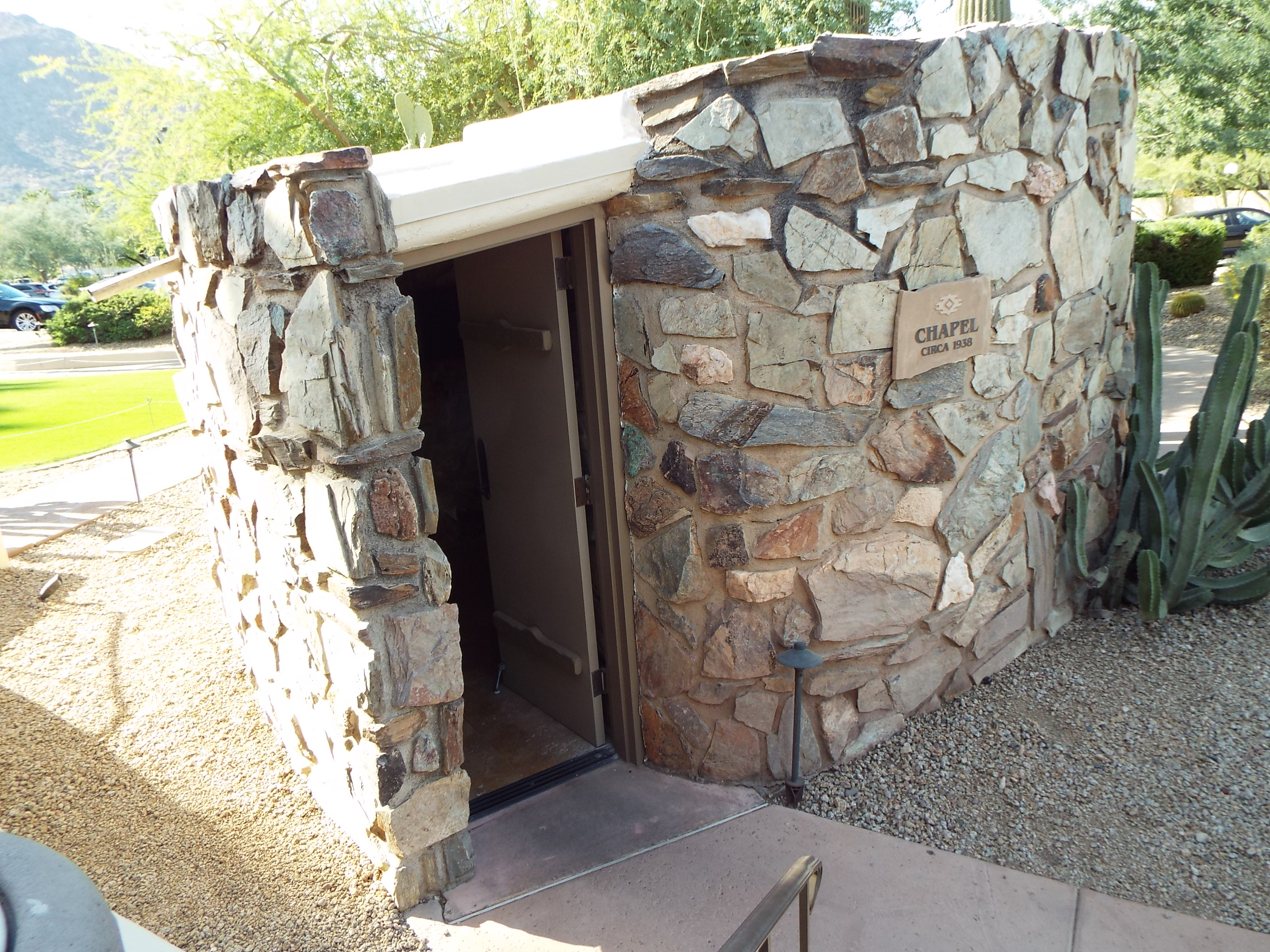
Camelback Inn Chapel.

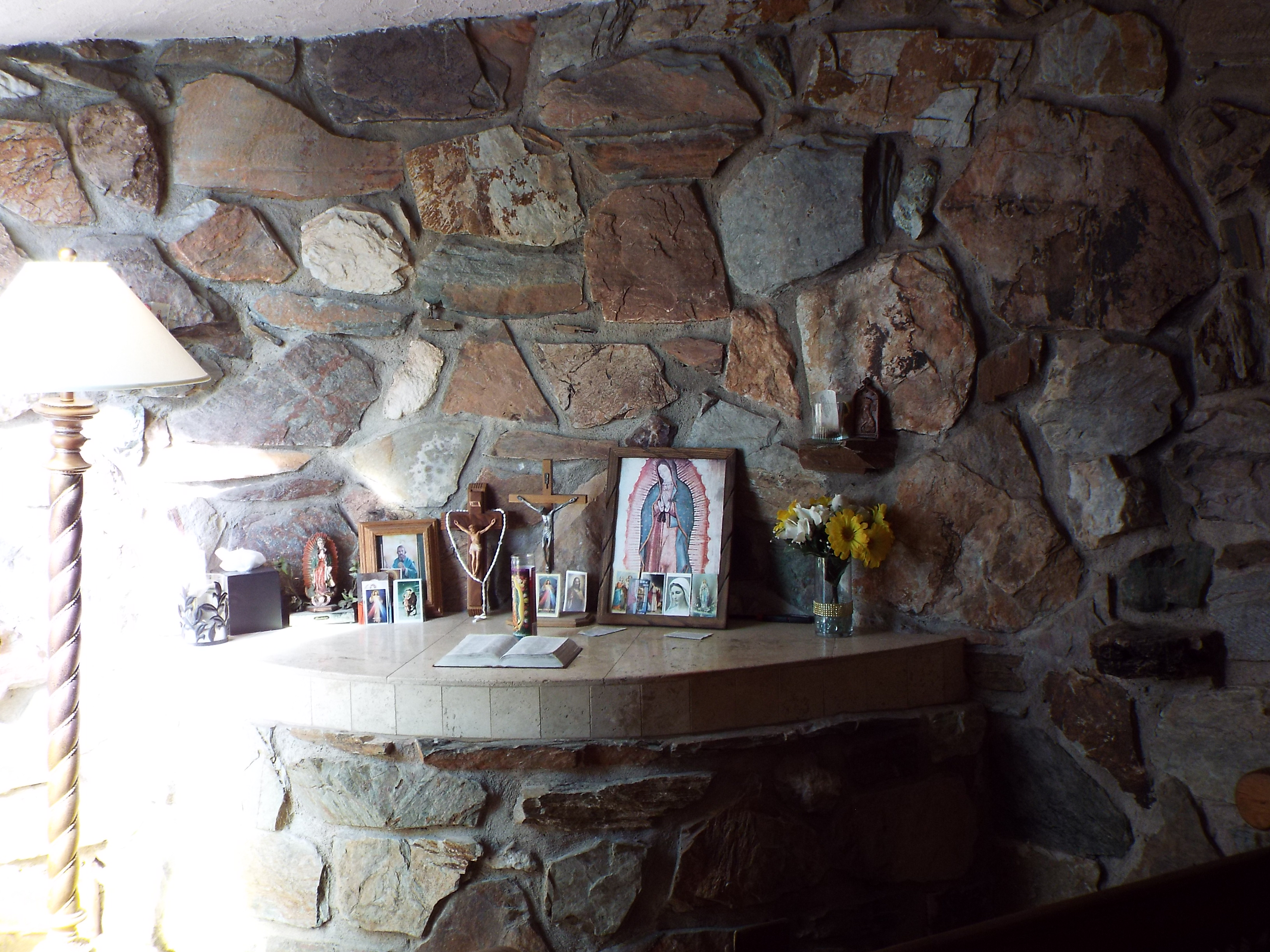
Inside the Camelback Inn Chapel.

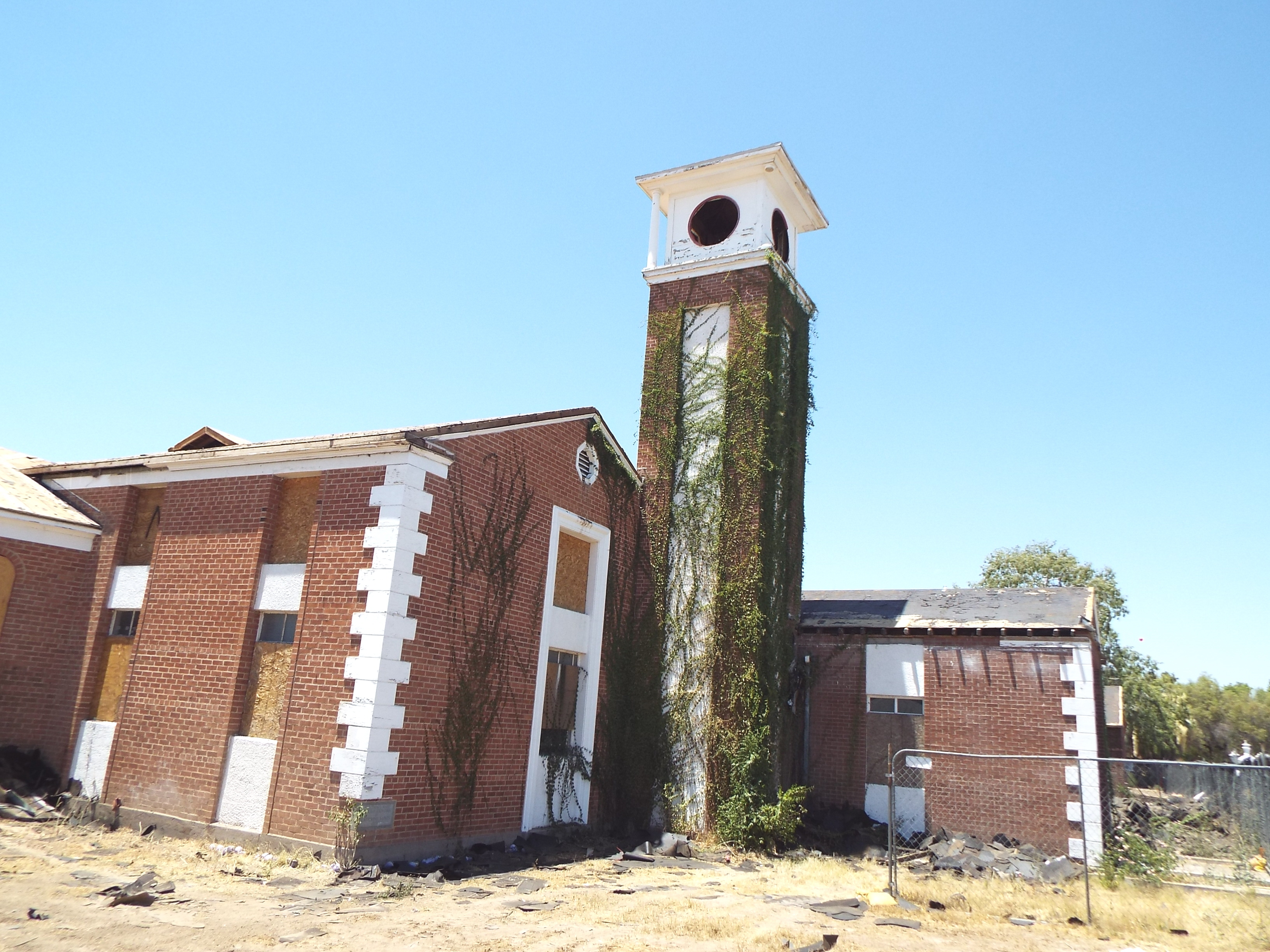
The Church of Jesus Christ of Latter-day Saints.

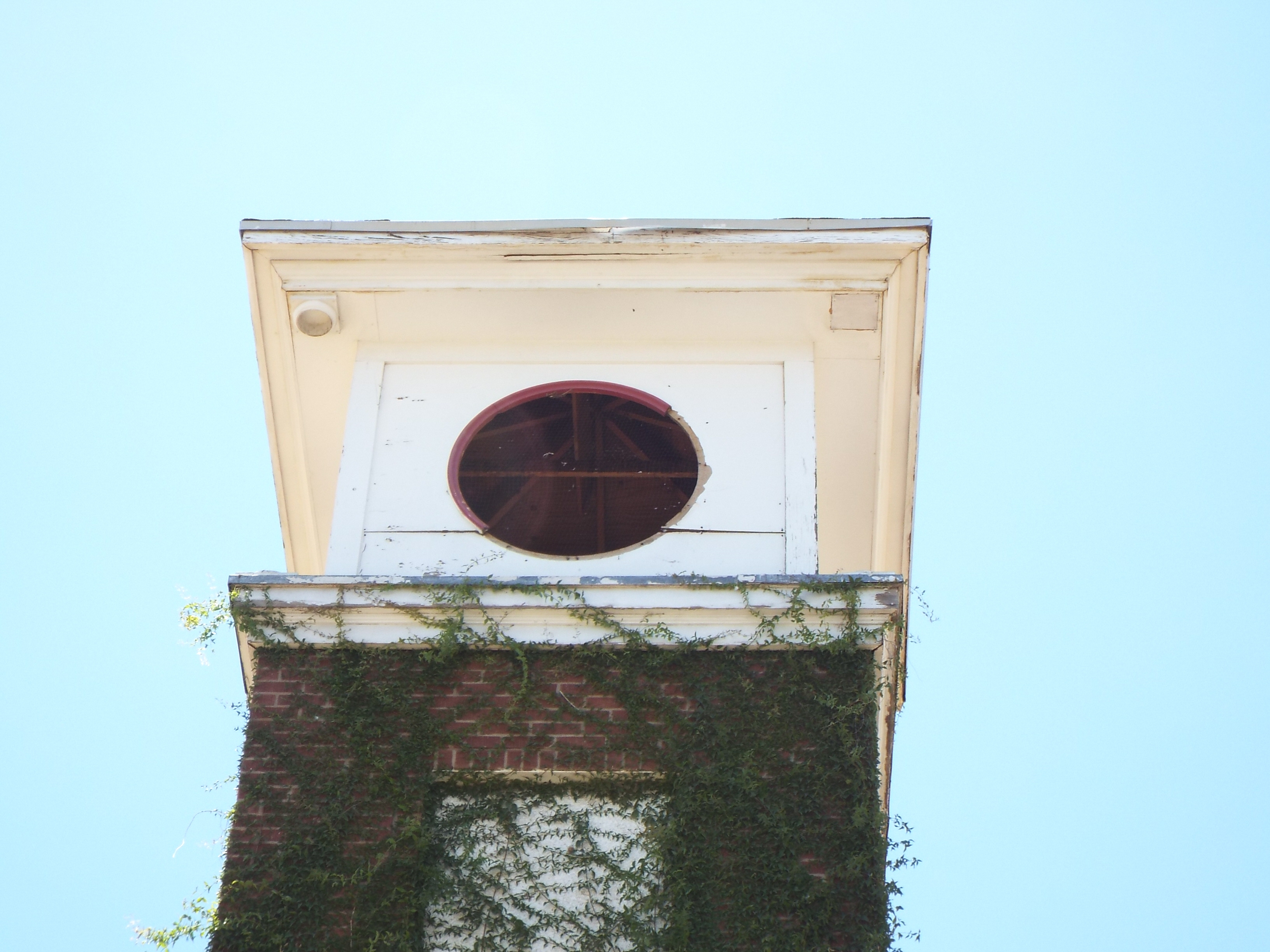
Where the once prominent church clock was once located.

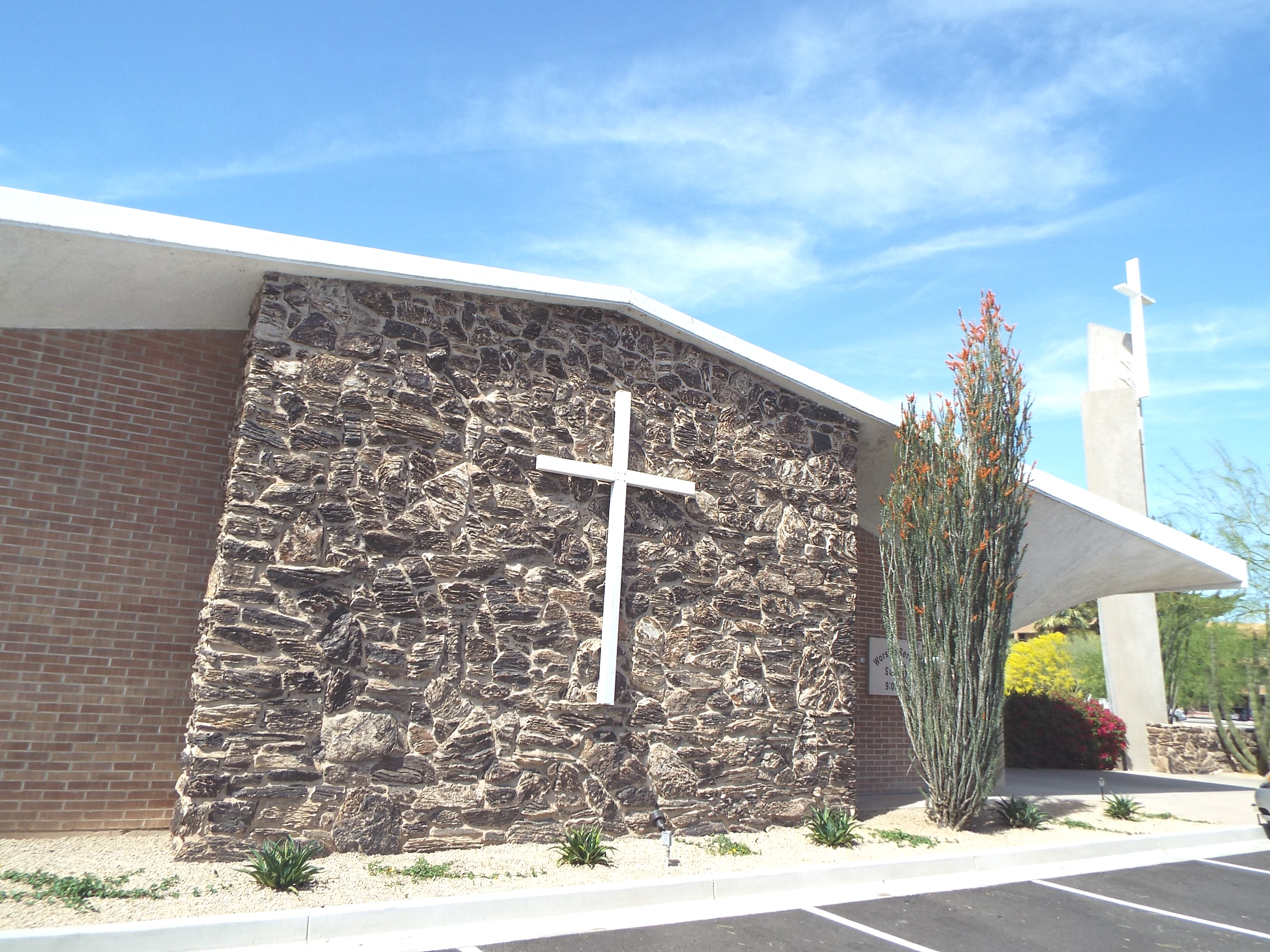
The Holy Cross Lutheran Church.

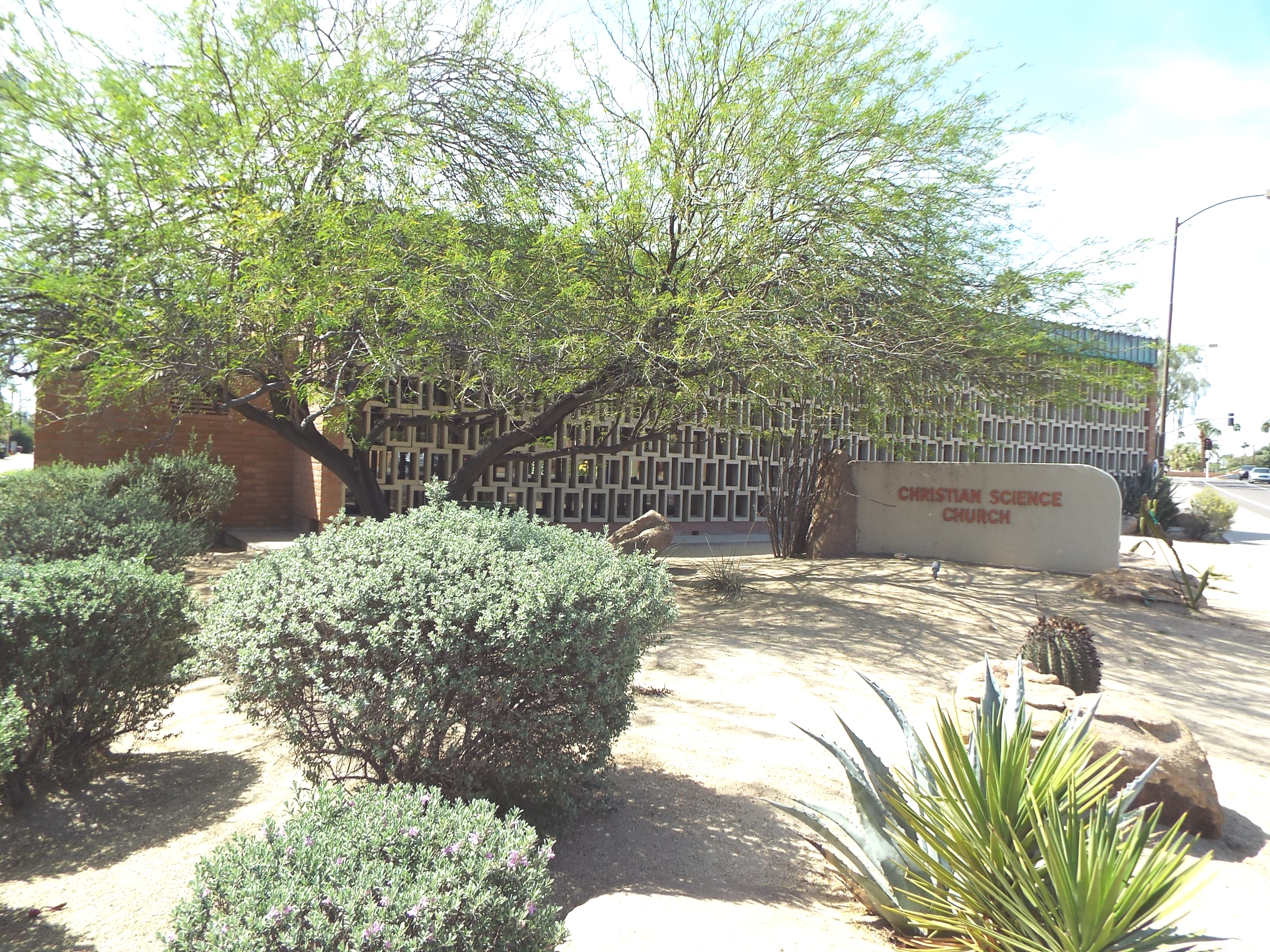
The First Church of Christ, Scientist.

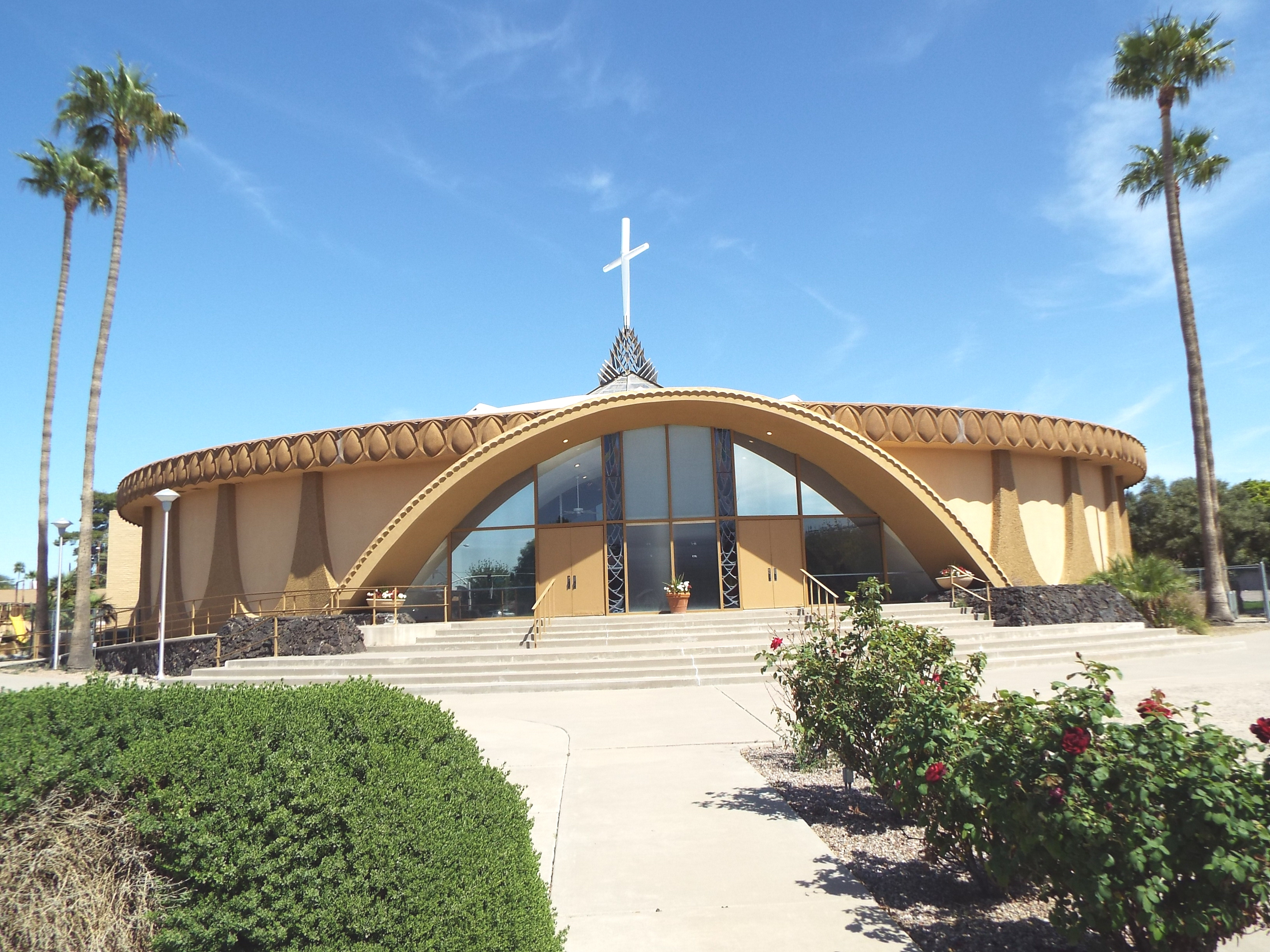
The Glass and Garden Community Church.

== Taliesin West ==
Taliesin West was built in 1931 and is located at 12345 N. Taliesin Drive. Taliesin West was the winter home and school of architect Frank Lloyd Wright in the desert from 1931 until his death in 1959. It was listed in the National Register of Historic Places on February 12, 1974, reference: 74000457.

Historic Taliesin West

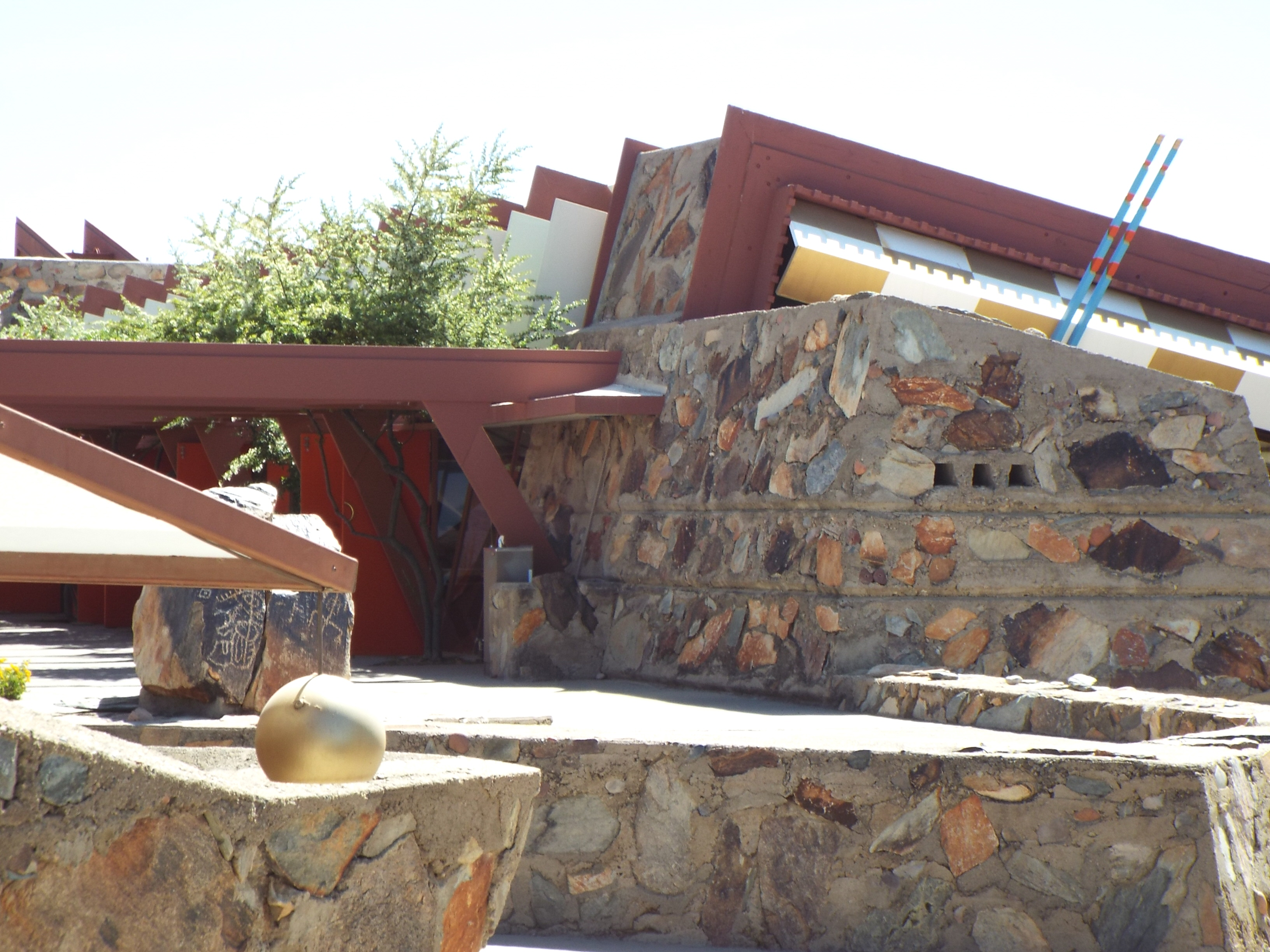
Historic Taliesin West

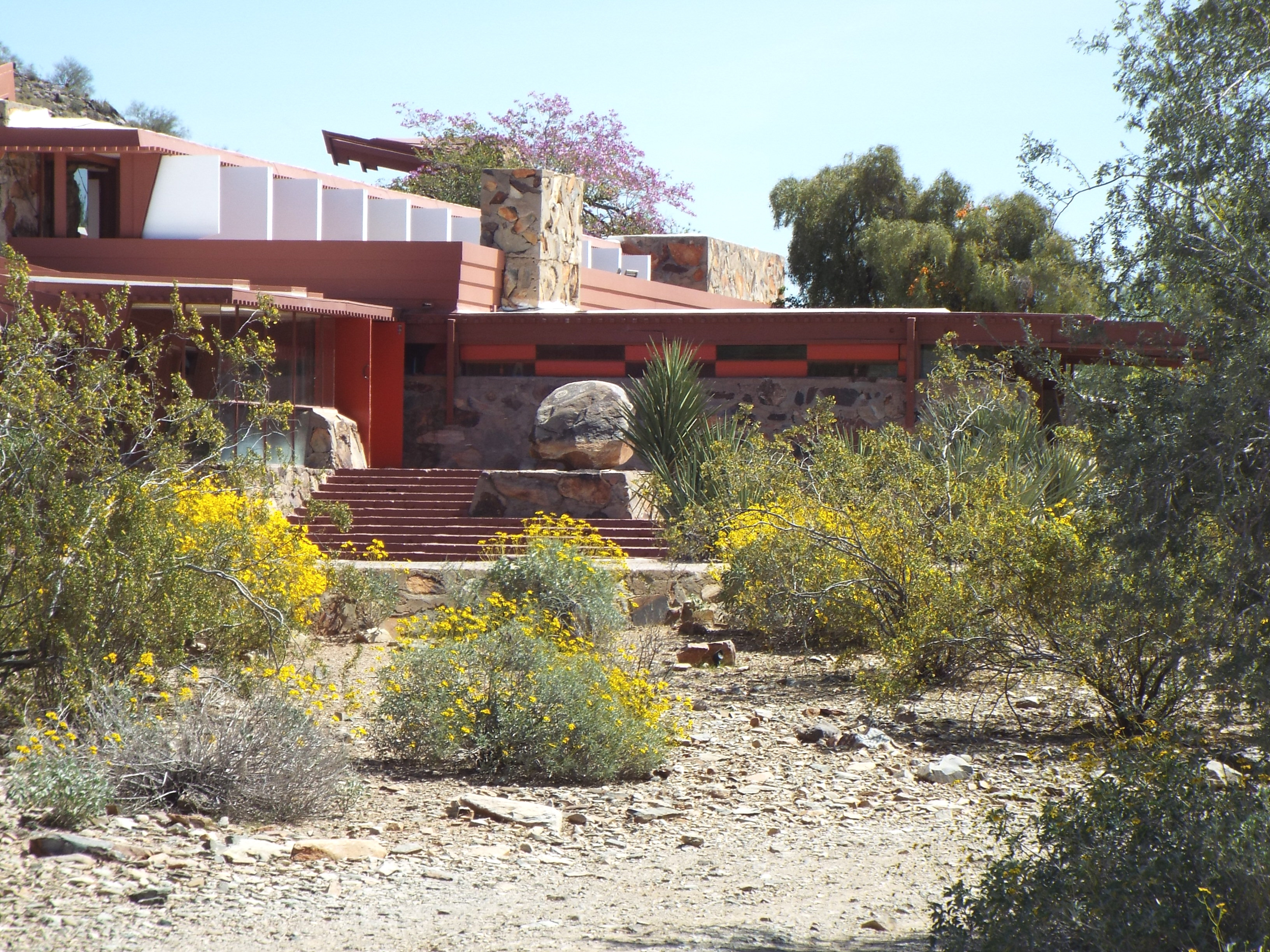
Different view of Taliesin West.

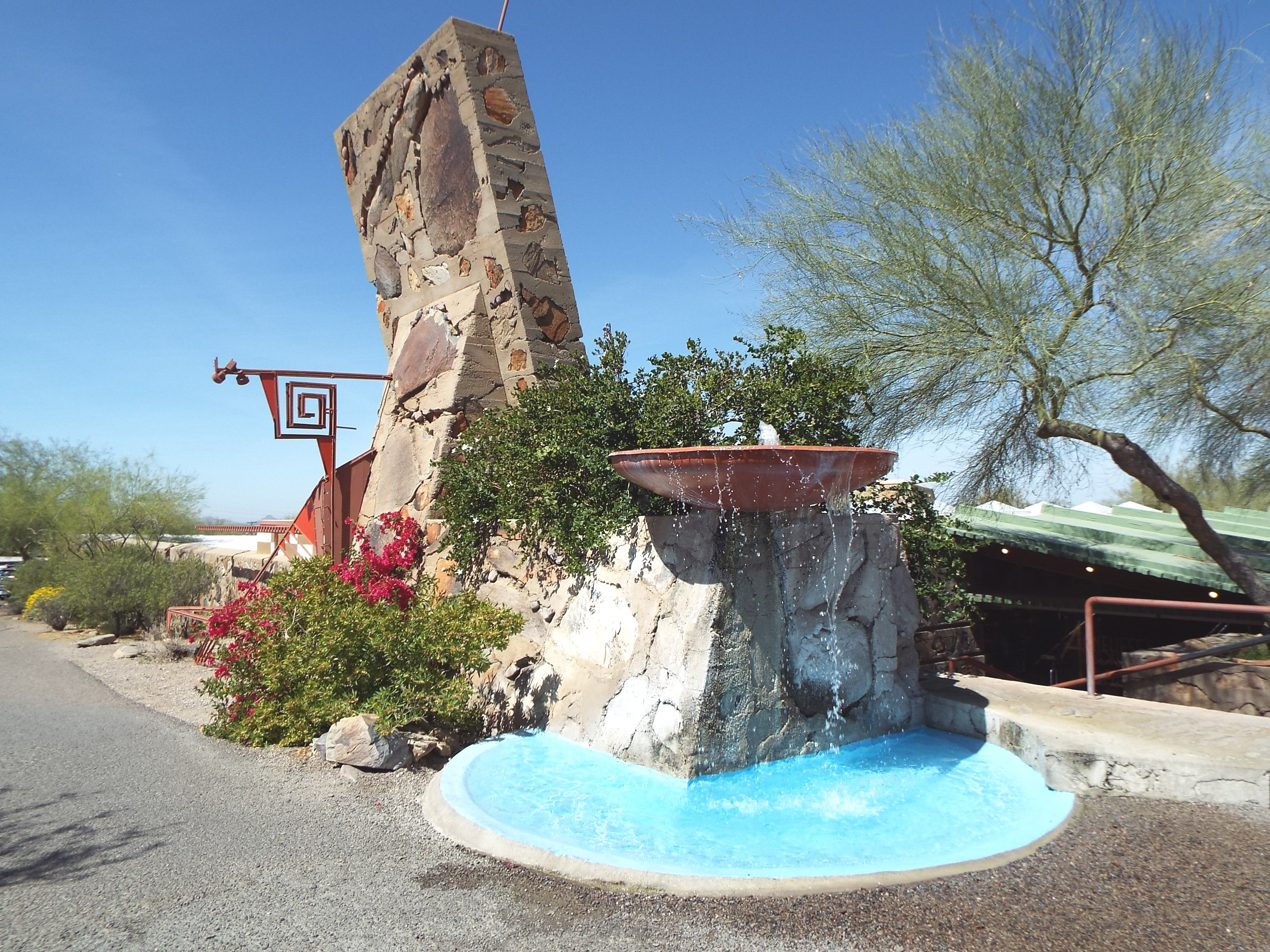
Entrance of Taliesin West.

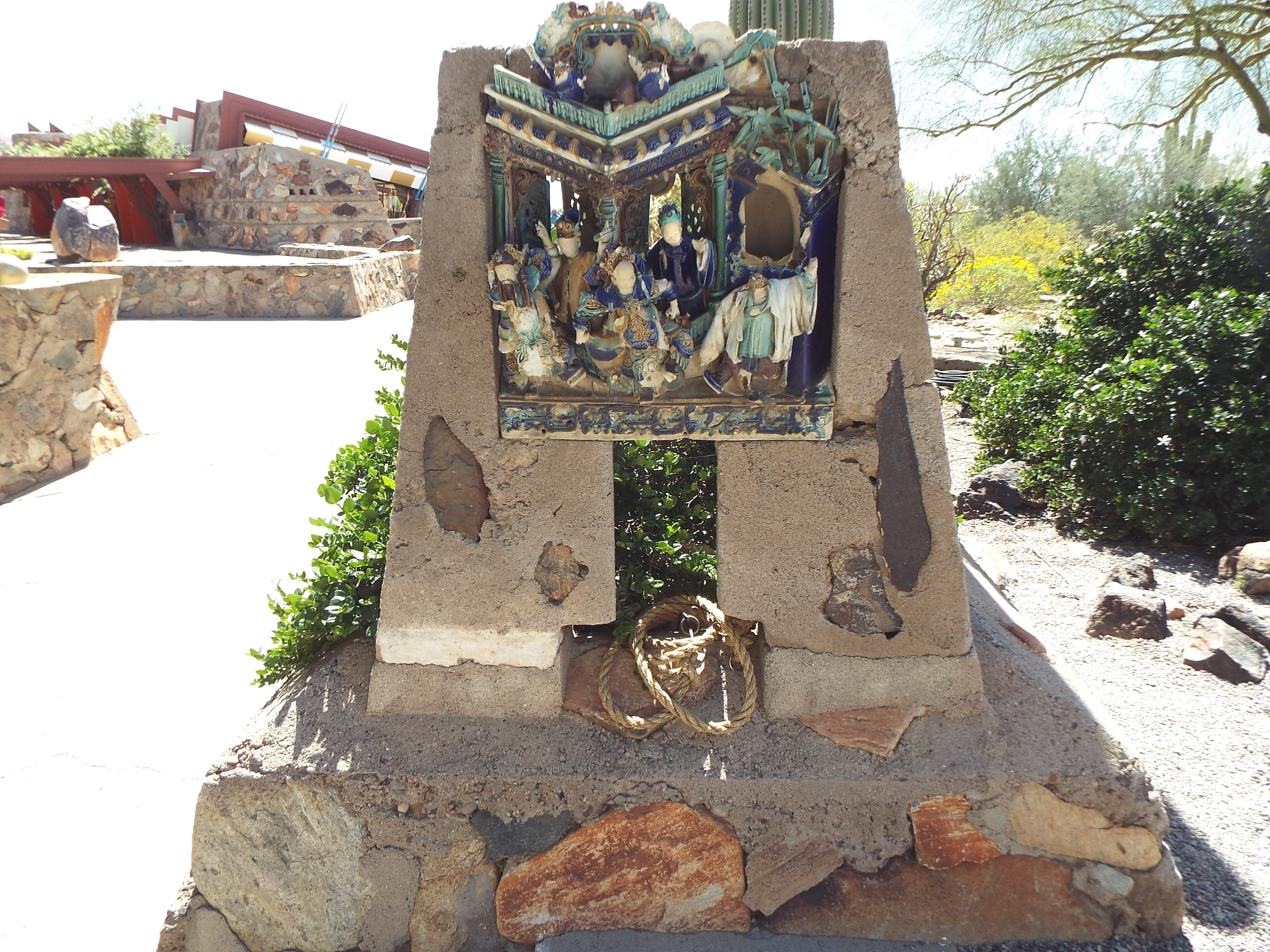
One of the many decorations which adorn the entrance of Taliesin West.

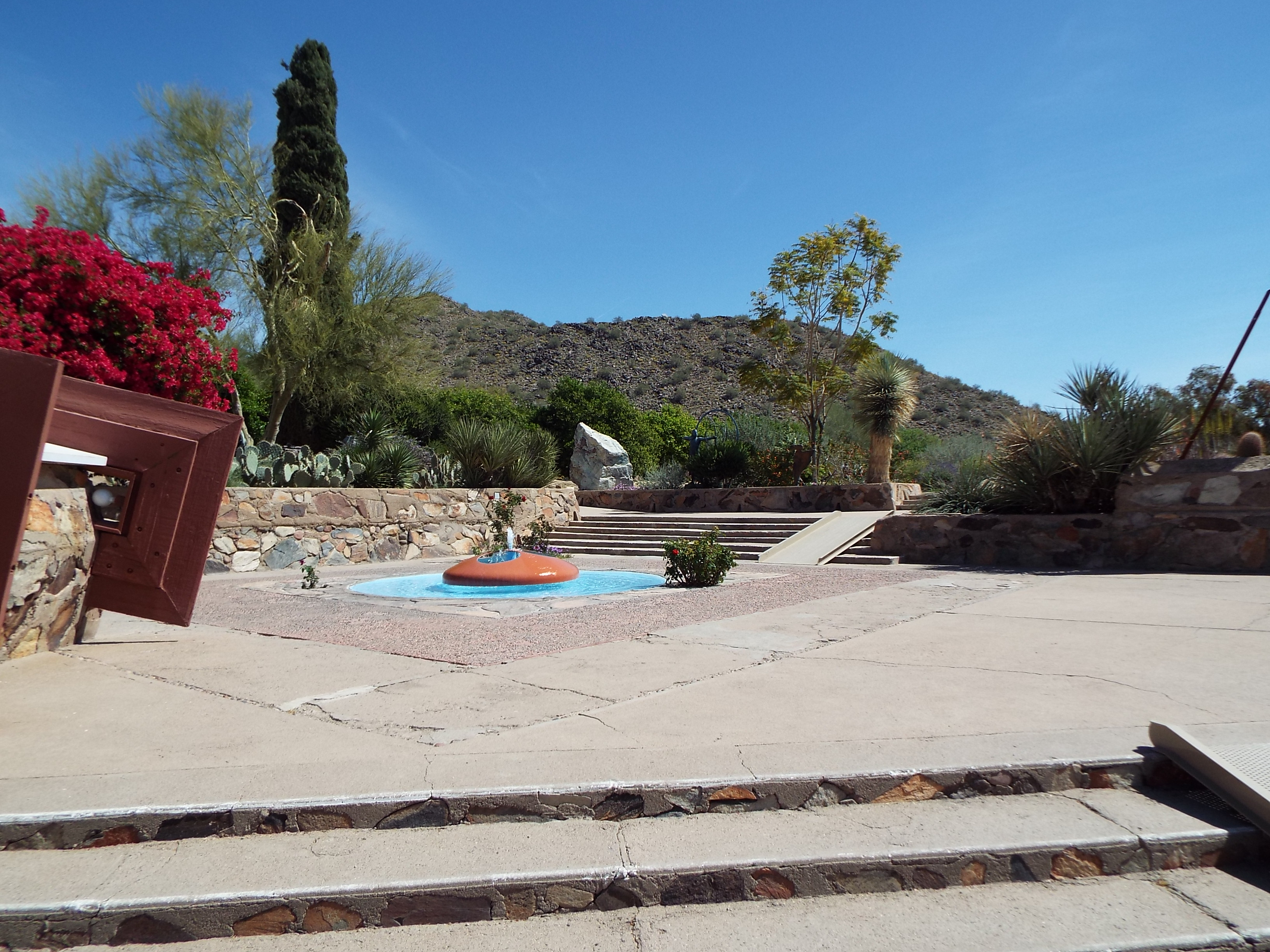
One of the gardens in Taliesin West.

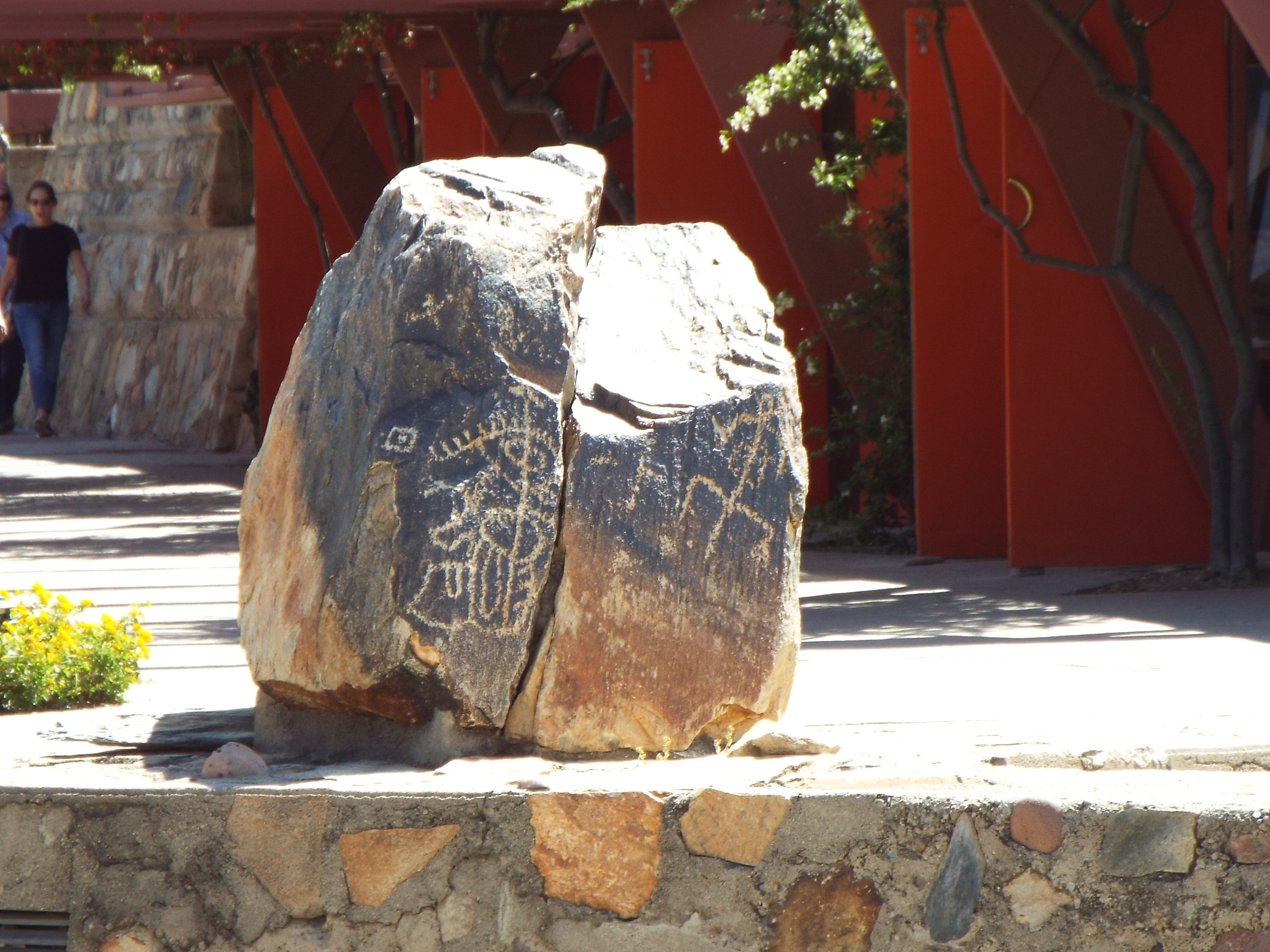
One of the Petrographs which adorn Taliesin West. The ancient Hohokam petrographs were discovered on the site of the construction of Taliesin West.

== The Great Papago Escape ==
During World War II, the United States established a German POW camp in the Papago desert of Scottsdale. The camp was known as Camp Papago Park. Imprisoned were mostly U-boat naval personnel which included U-boat commander Jürgen Wattenberg. The prison guards were unaware that Wattenburg and some of his men were digging a tunnel from the prison which would exit close to the Crosscut Canal. The prison guards believed that the prisoners were building a field to play soccer. The plan was to use some lumber they would use in order to float towards Mexico via the Gila River which led to the Colorado River and thus obtaining their freedom. However, what they did not know was that the rivers of Arizona dried up at that time of the year. On the night of December 23, 1944, the commandeer and 24 of his men decided to carry out their plan. When they reached the end of the tunnel they found themselves with a dried up river. Eventually they were all captured and returned to the POW camp. The POW Papago escape is the largest escape of its nature in the history of the United States.

The Great Papago Escape

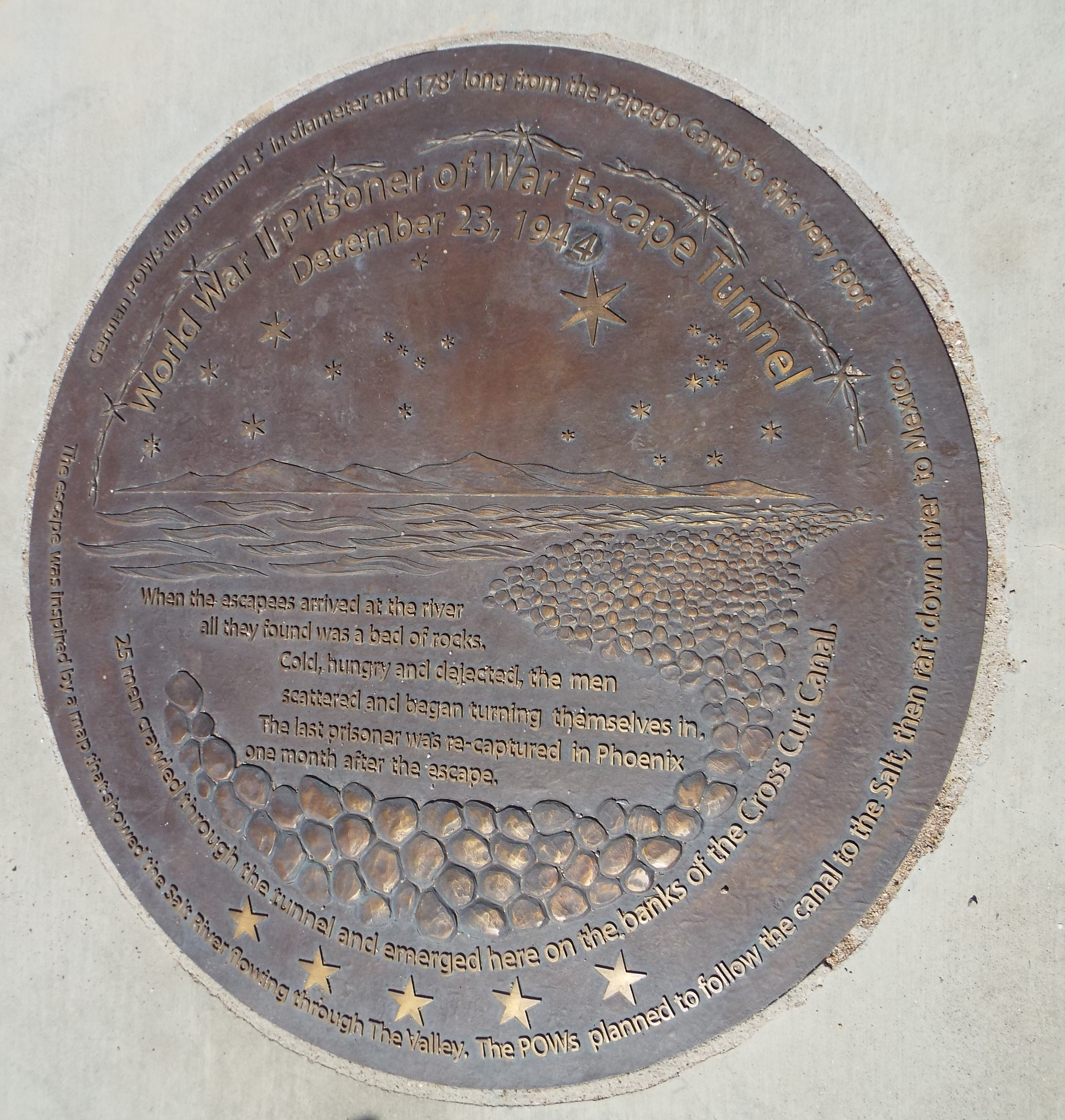
Historic Papago Escape Tunnel exit marker

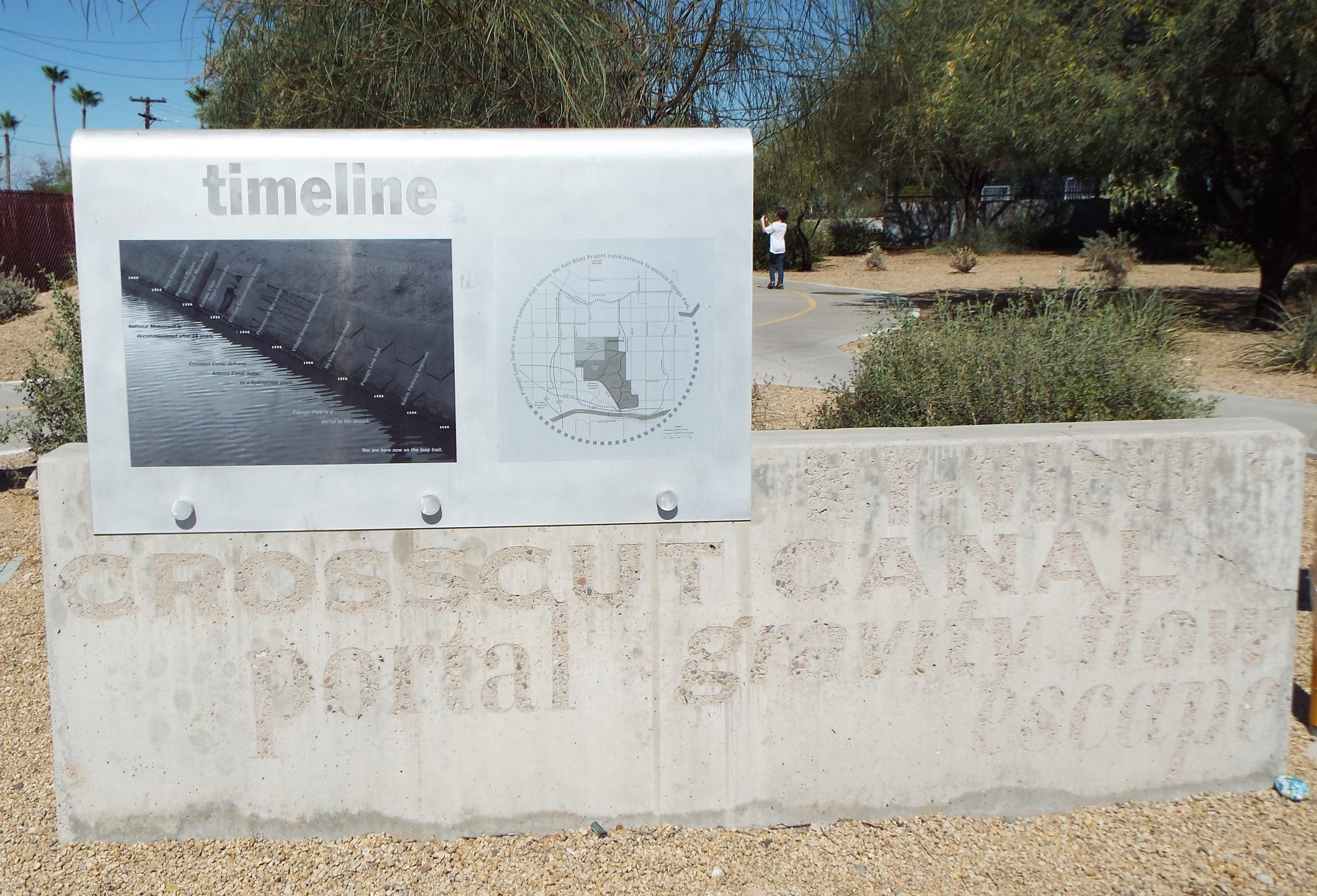
Historic Crosscut Canal

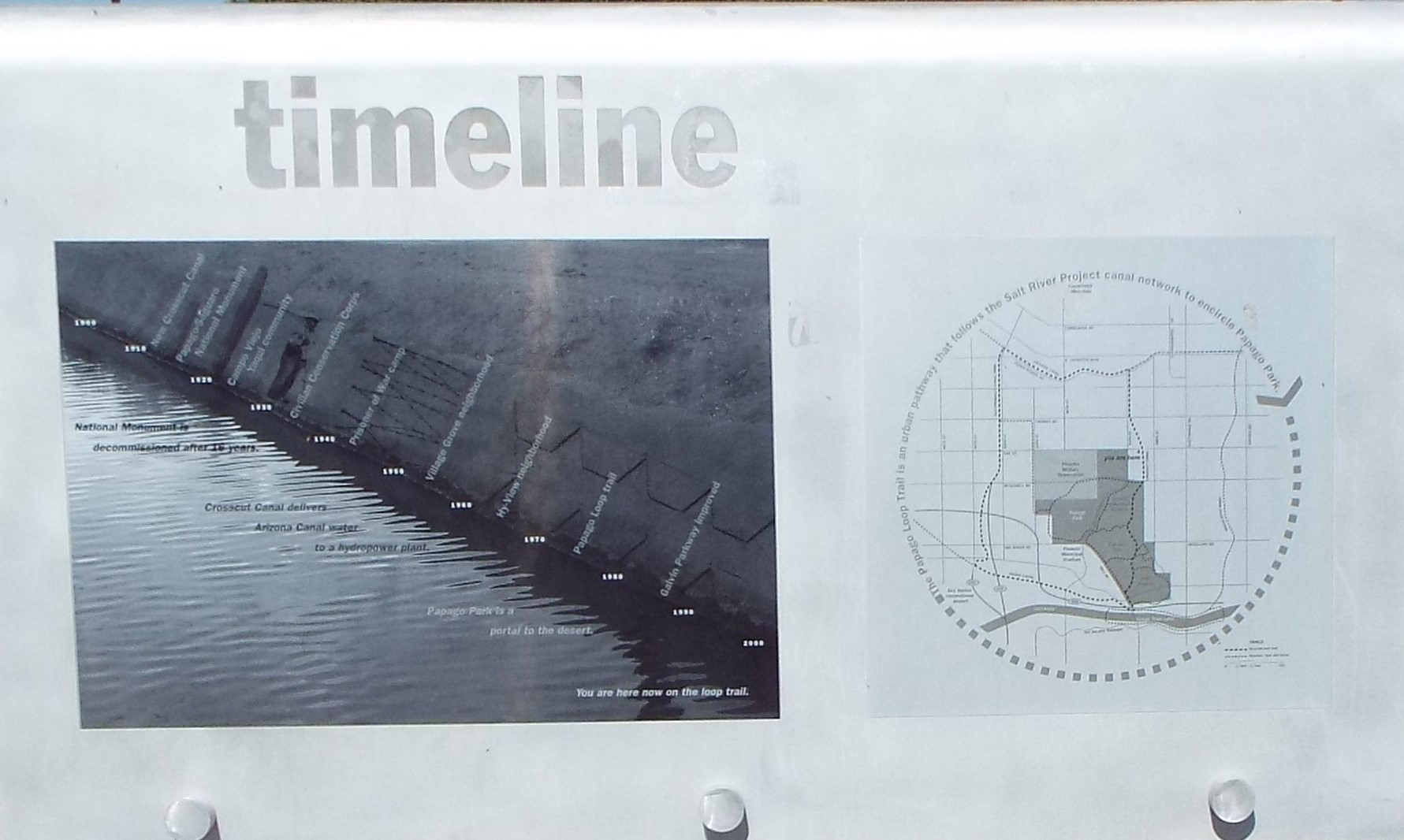
Historic Crosscut Canal Timeline

== McCormick-Stillman Railroad Park ==
The McCormick-Stillman Railroad Park houses the Roald Amundsen Pullman Private Railroad Car which was built in 1928. On different occasions the Roald Amundsen Pullman Private Railroad Car reportedly carried Presidents Hoover, Roosevelt (FDR), Truman and Eisenhower. The Roald Amundsen Pullman Private Railroad Car was listed in the National Register of Historic Places on August 6, 2009, reference: #09000582.

Historic McCormick-Stillman Railroad Park

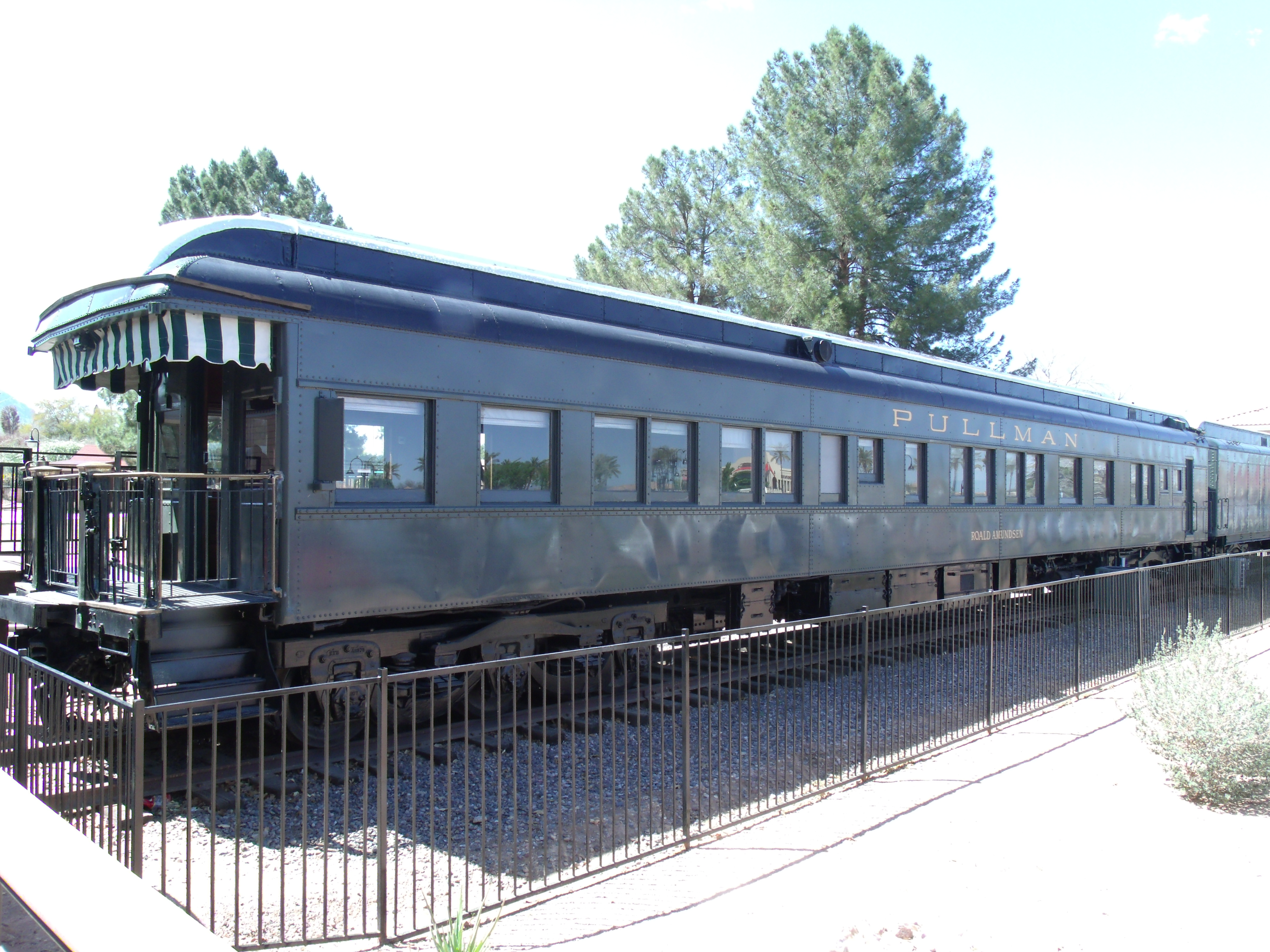
Historic Roald Amundsen Pullman Private Railroad Car.

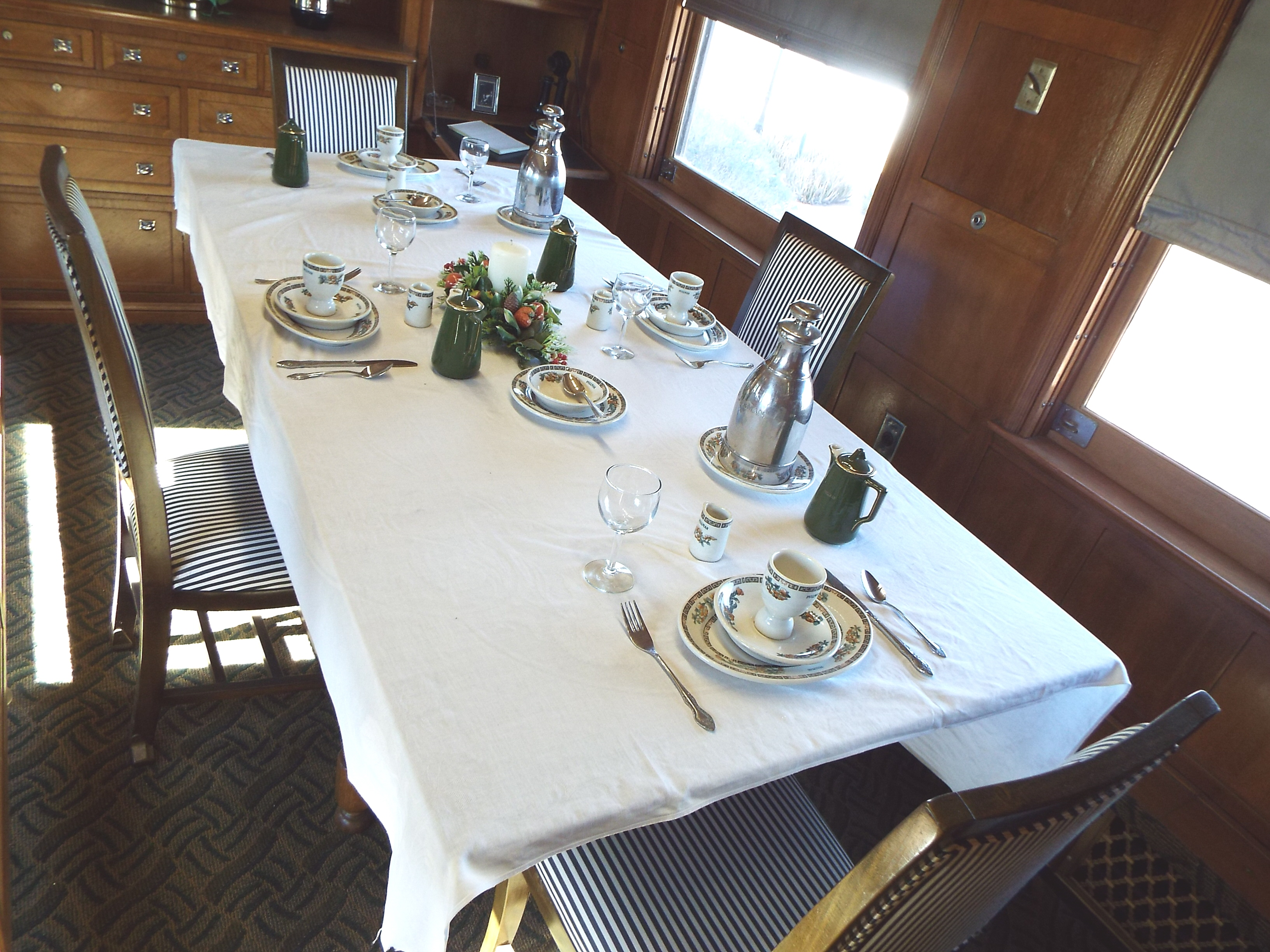
The Dining room in the Roald Amundsen Pullman Private Railroad Car.

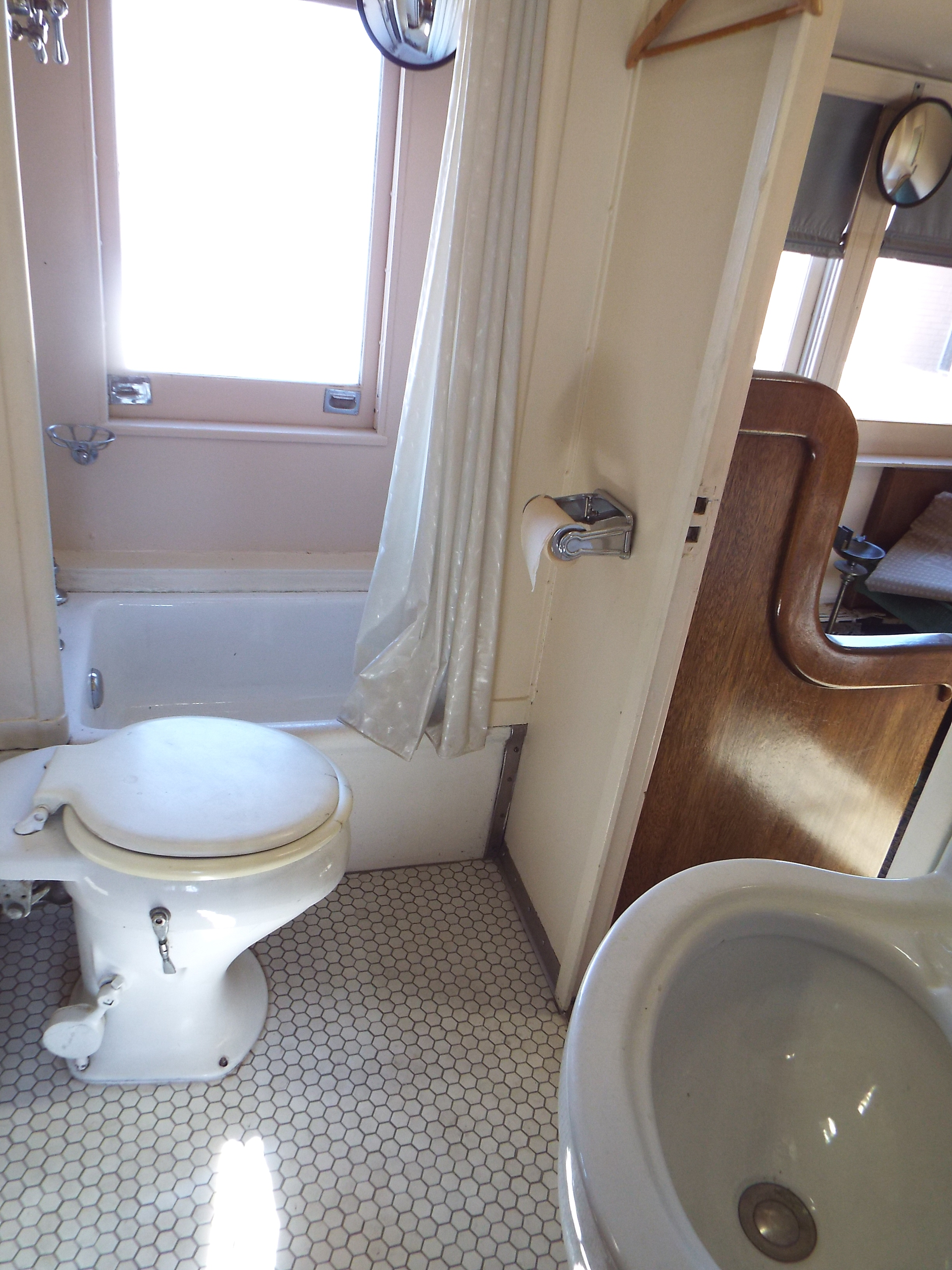
The Bathroom in the Roald Amundsen Pullman Private Railroad Car.

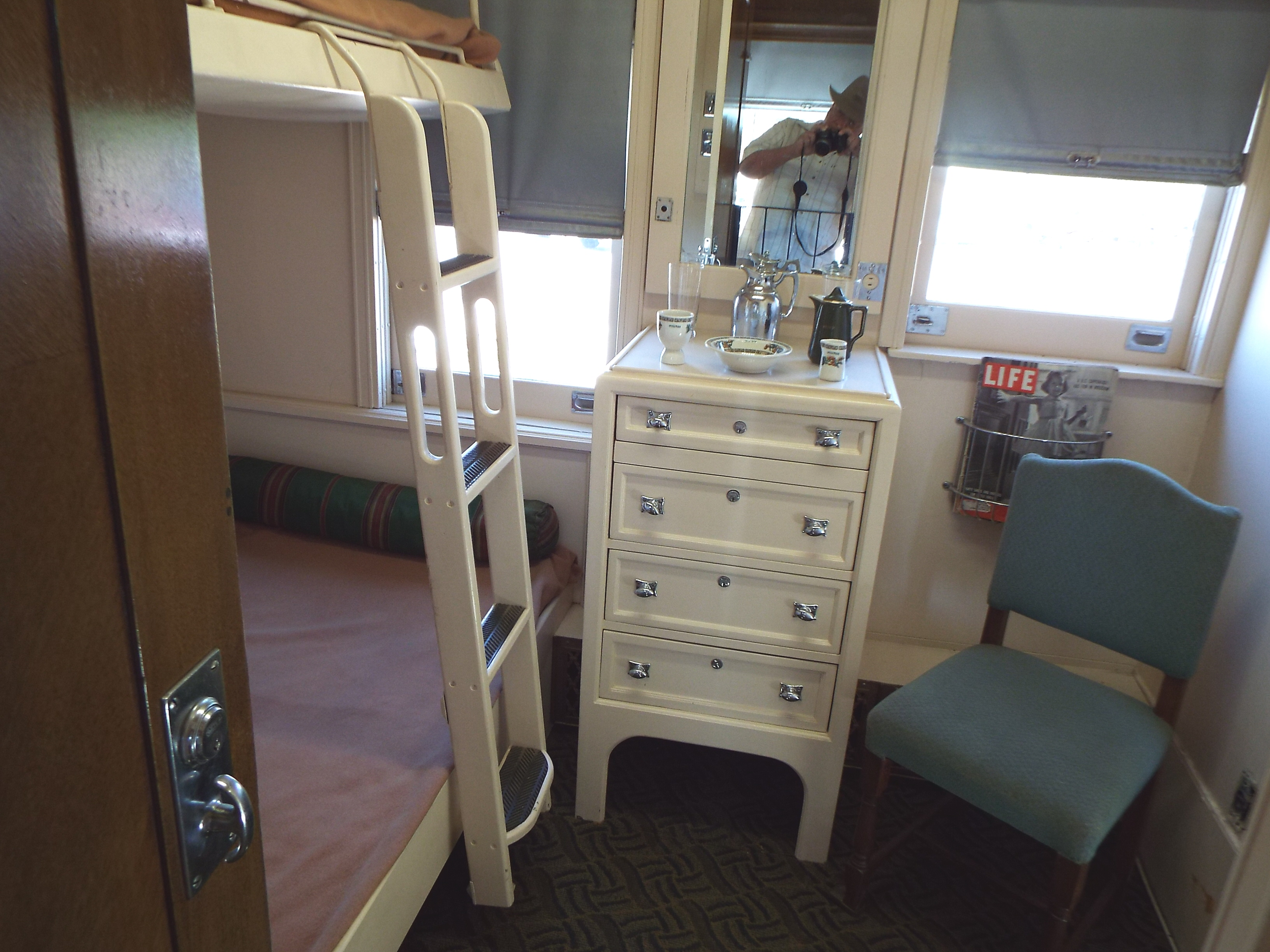
A Bedroom in the historic Roald Amundsen Pullman Private Railroad Car.

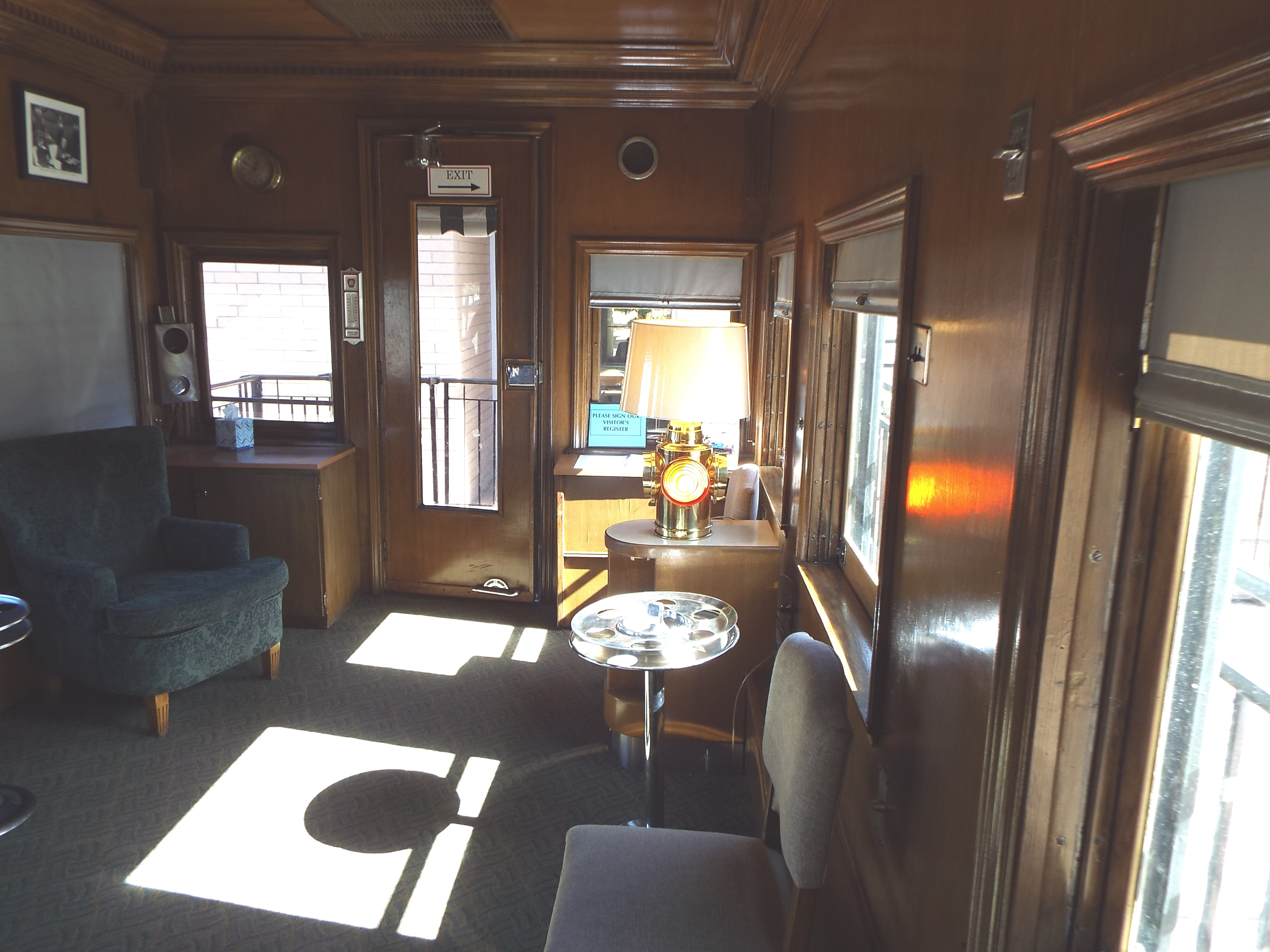
The Living room in the historic Roald Amundsen Pullman Private Railroad Car.

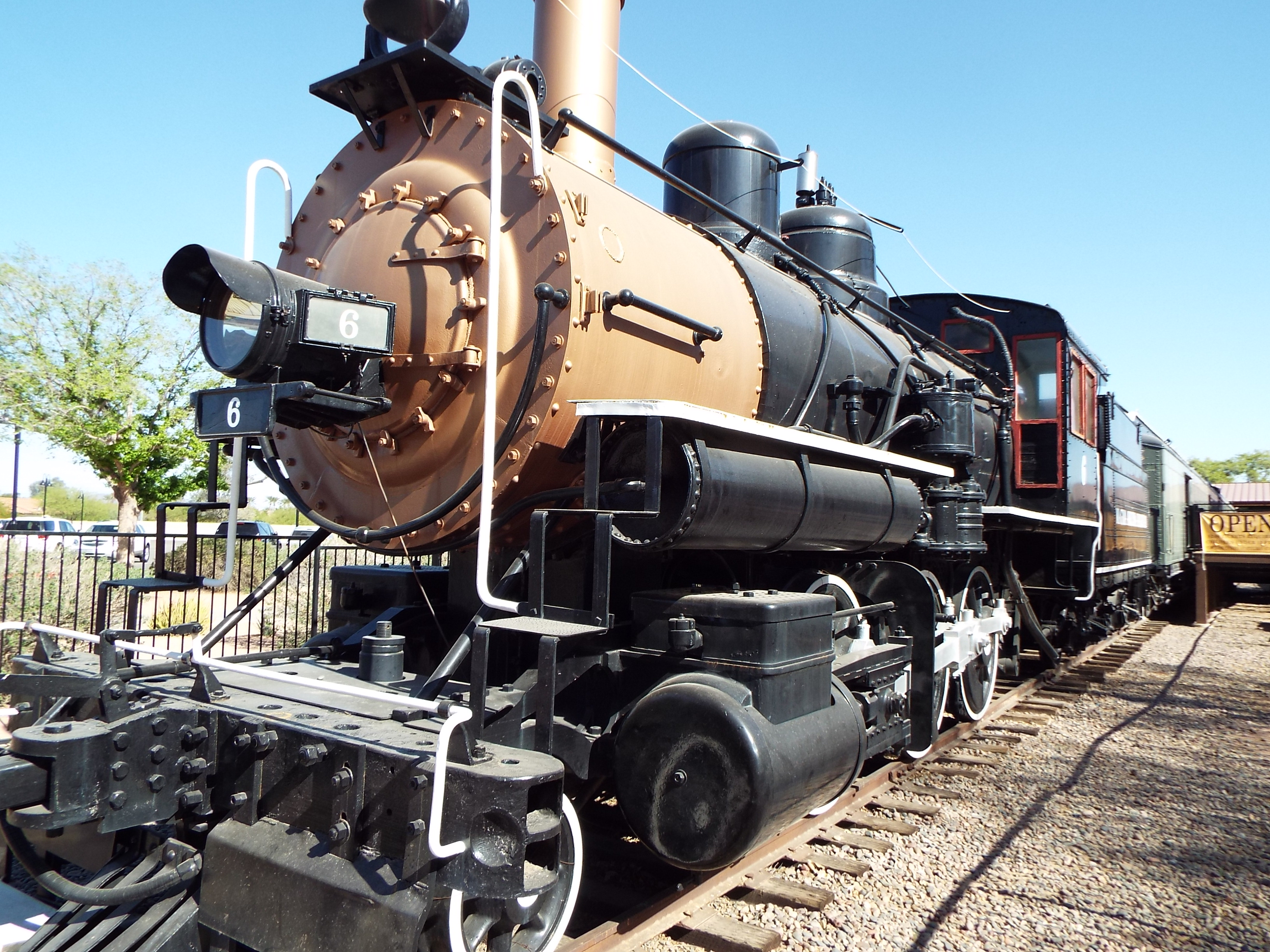
Historic Magma Arizona Railroad Engine No. 6, built in 1906

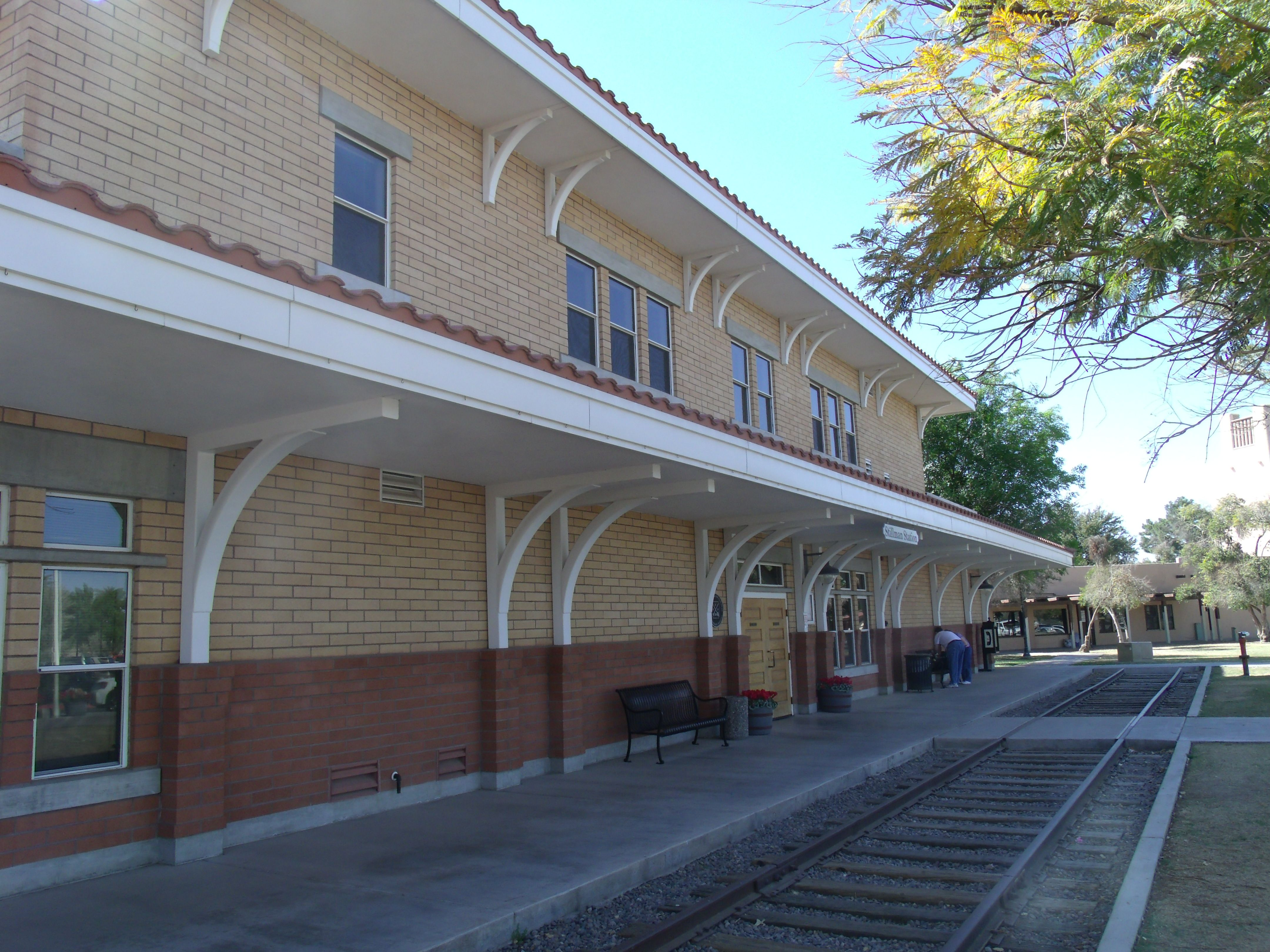
Front view of Stillman Station, a replica of the Clifton Station (Clifton Az.) built in 1901

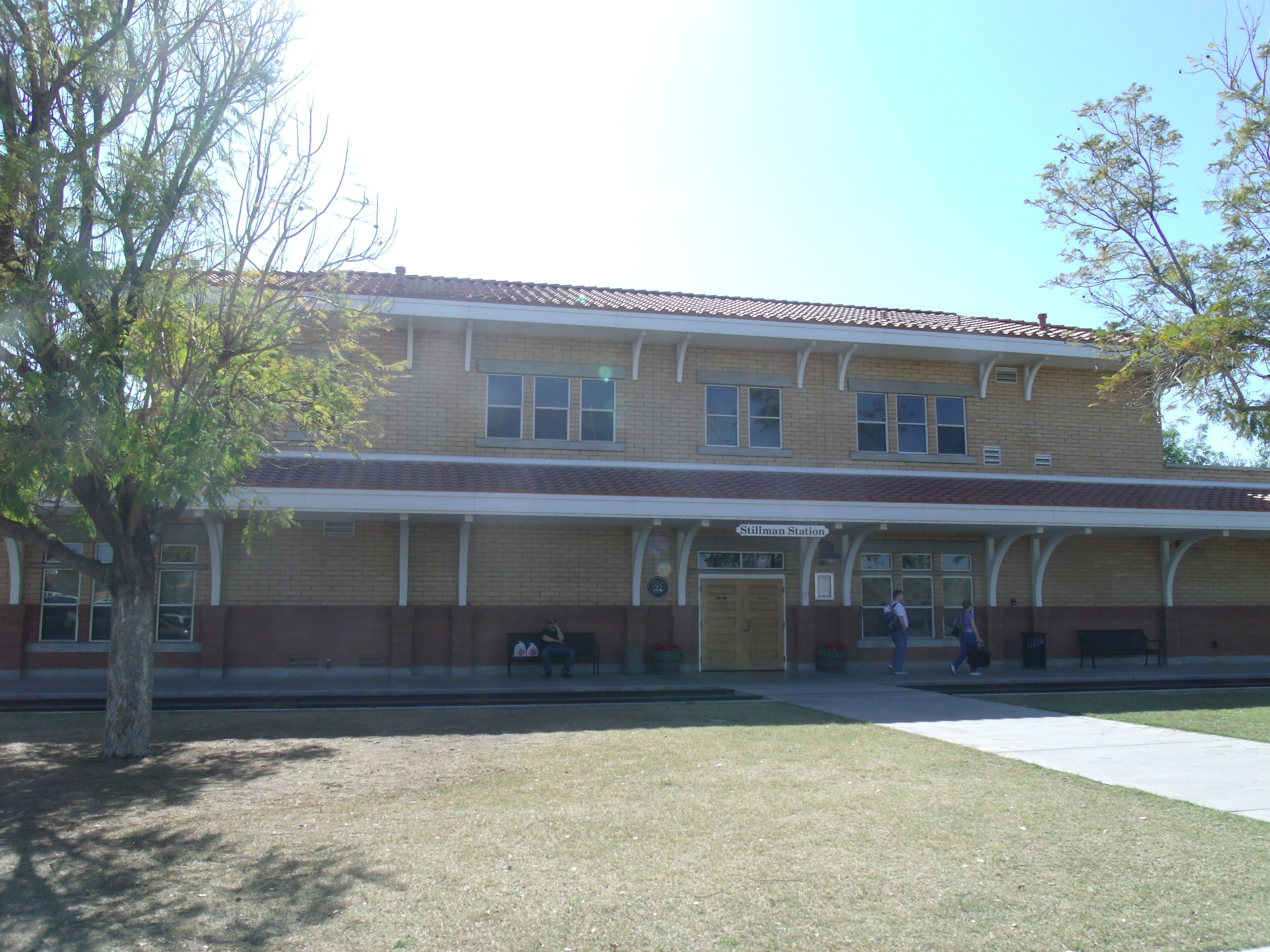
Rear view of the Stillman Station.

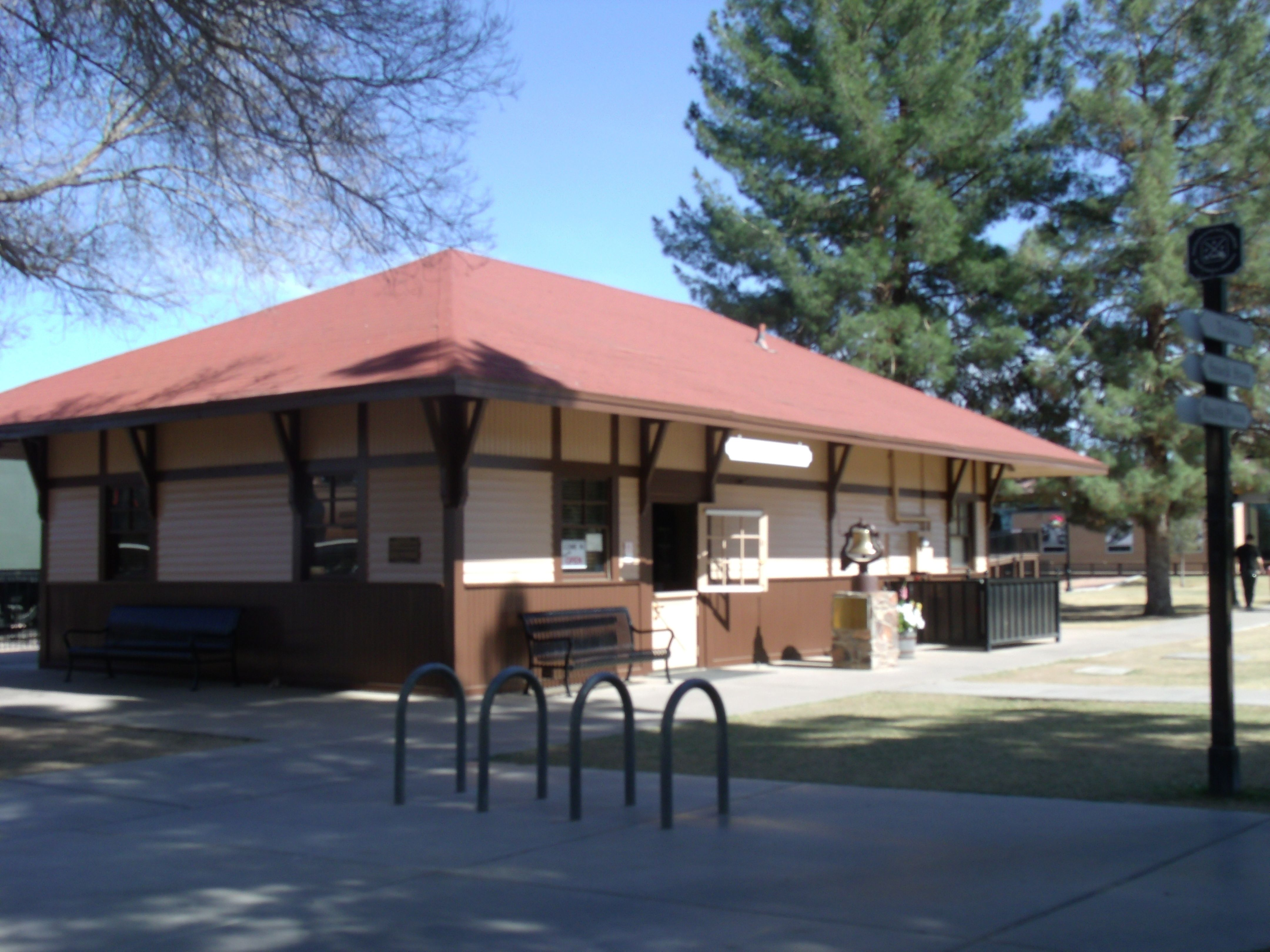
Peoria Railroad Depot – built in 1895 in Peoria, Az., was dismantled and rebuilt at the park.

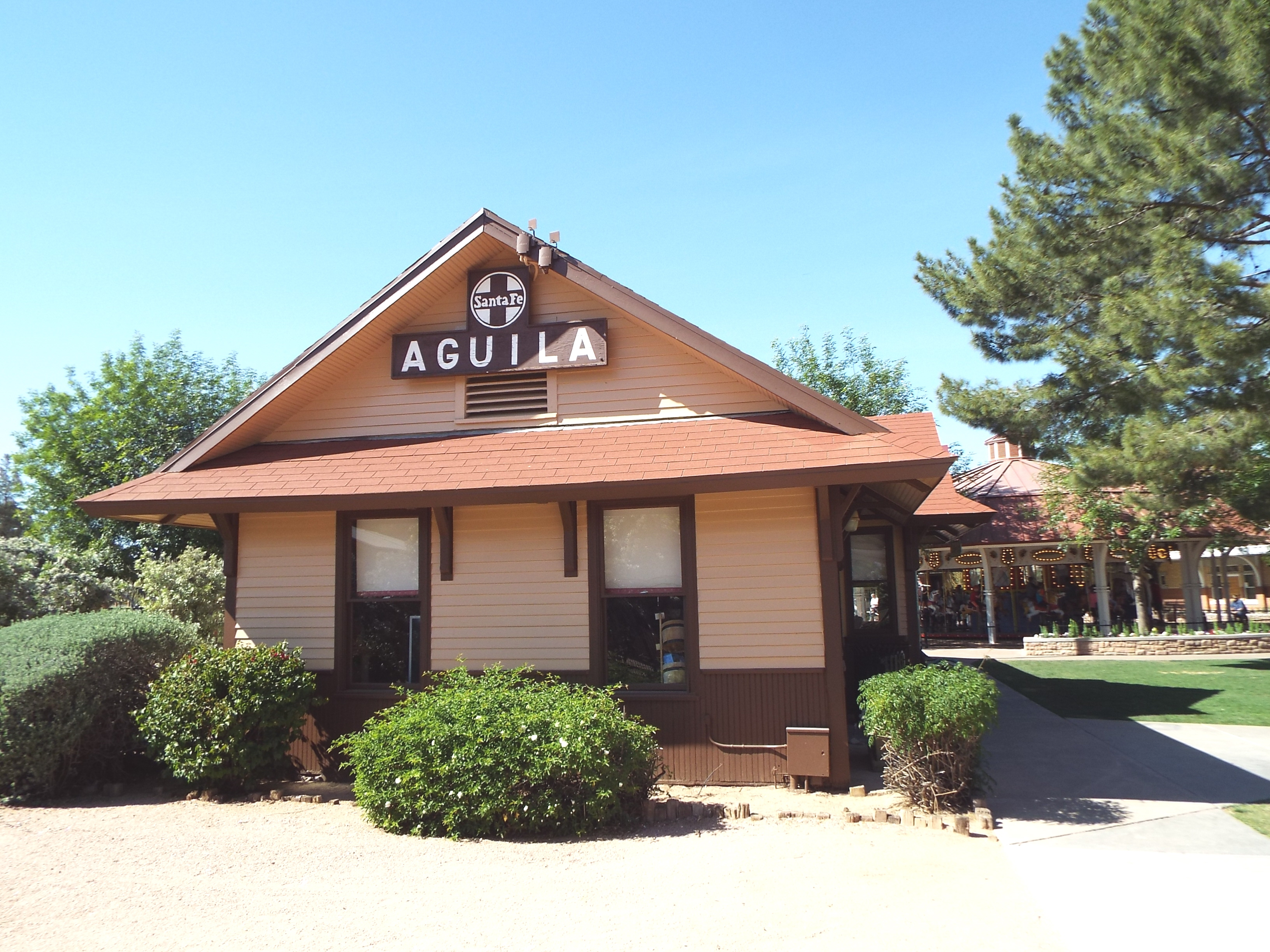
The Aguila Depot, built in 1907 by the Santa Fe, Prescott and Phoenix Railway and moved to the McCormick-Stillman Railroad Park.

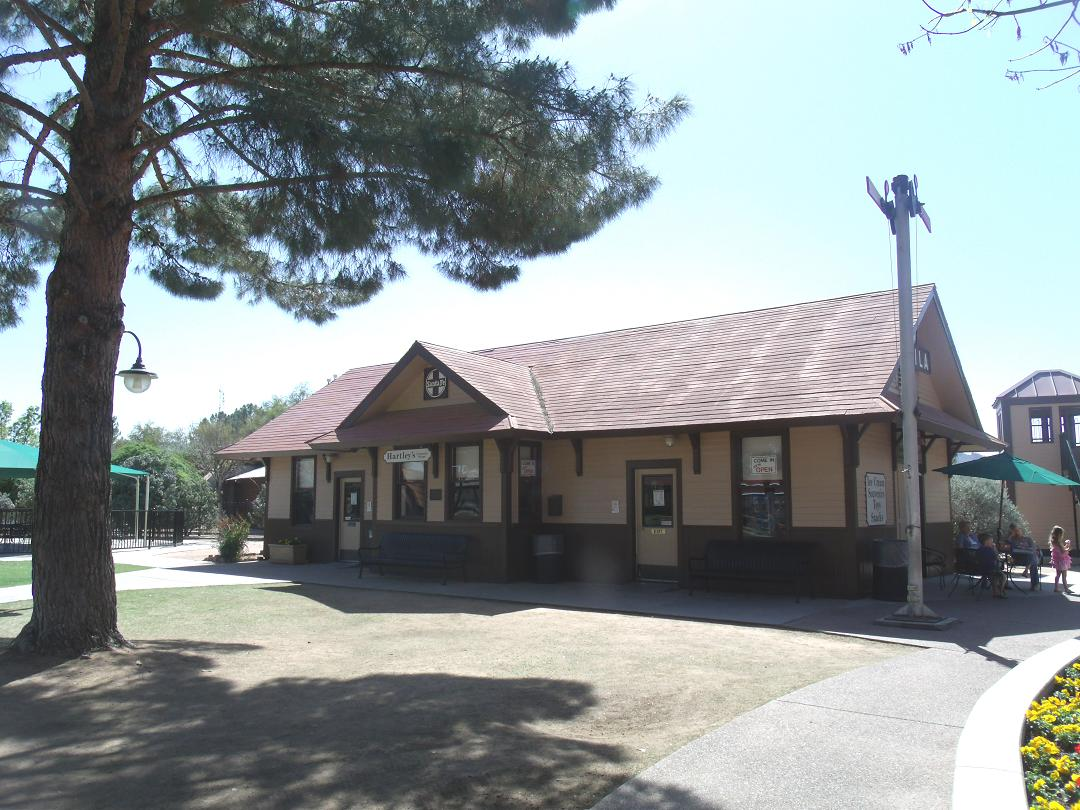
Different view of the Aguila Depot.

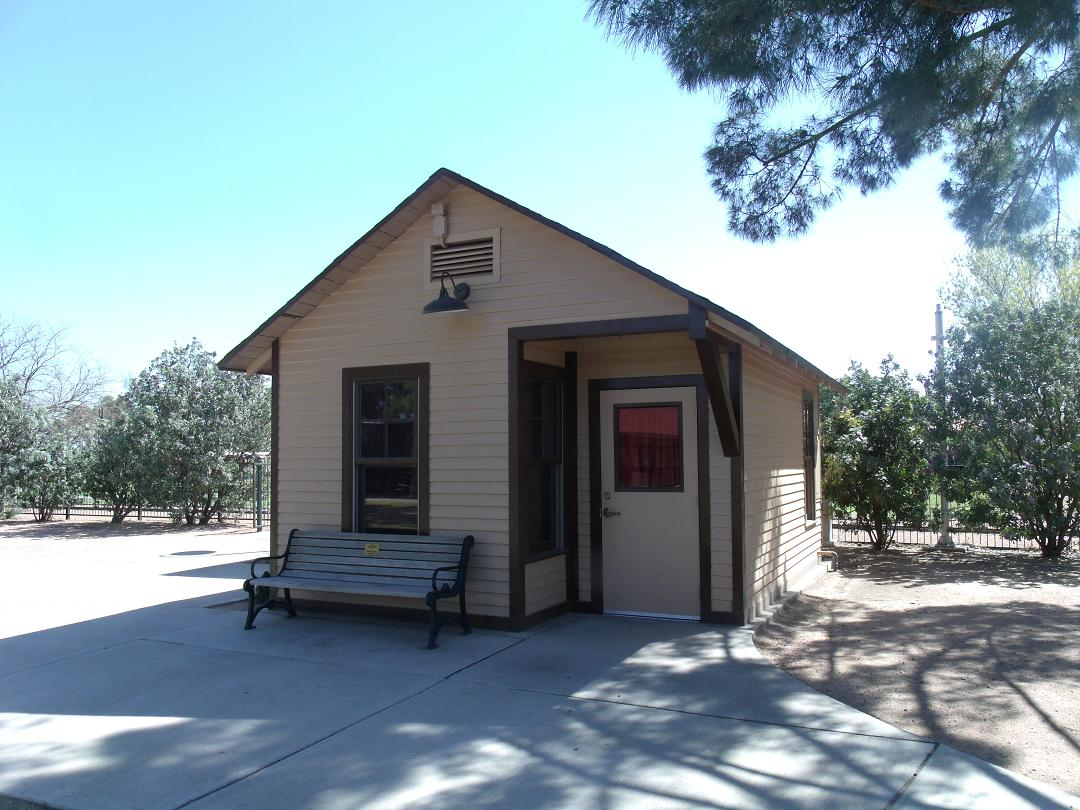
The Maricopa Depot, built in the 1930s by the Southern Pacific Railroad and moved to the McCormick-Stillman Railroad Park.

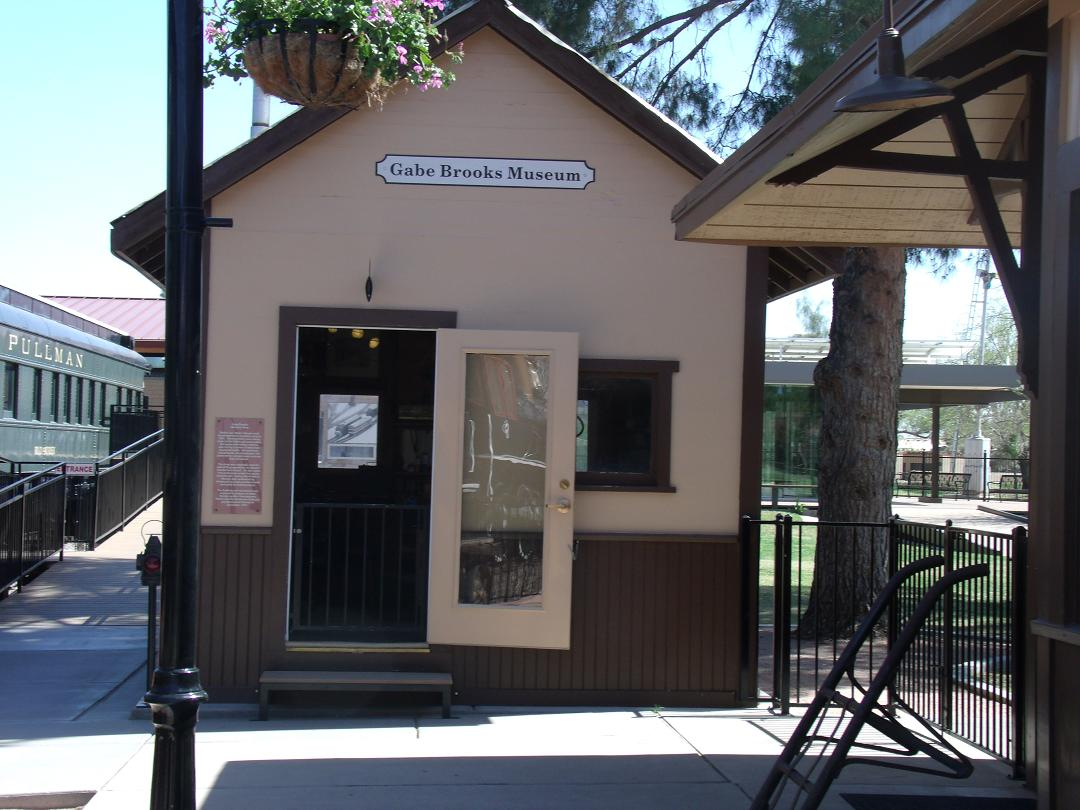
Walter "Gabe" Brooks Machine Shop built in 1930. The shop, which was Scottsdale first machine shop, was moved to the McCormick-Stillman Railroad Park and is now the "Gabe Brooks Museum".

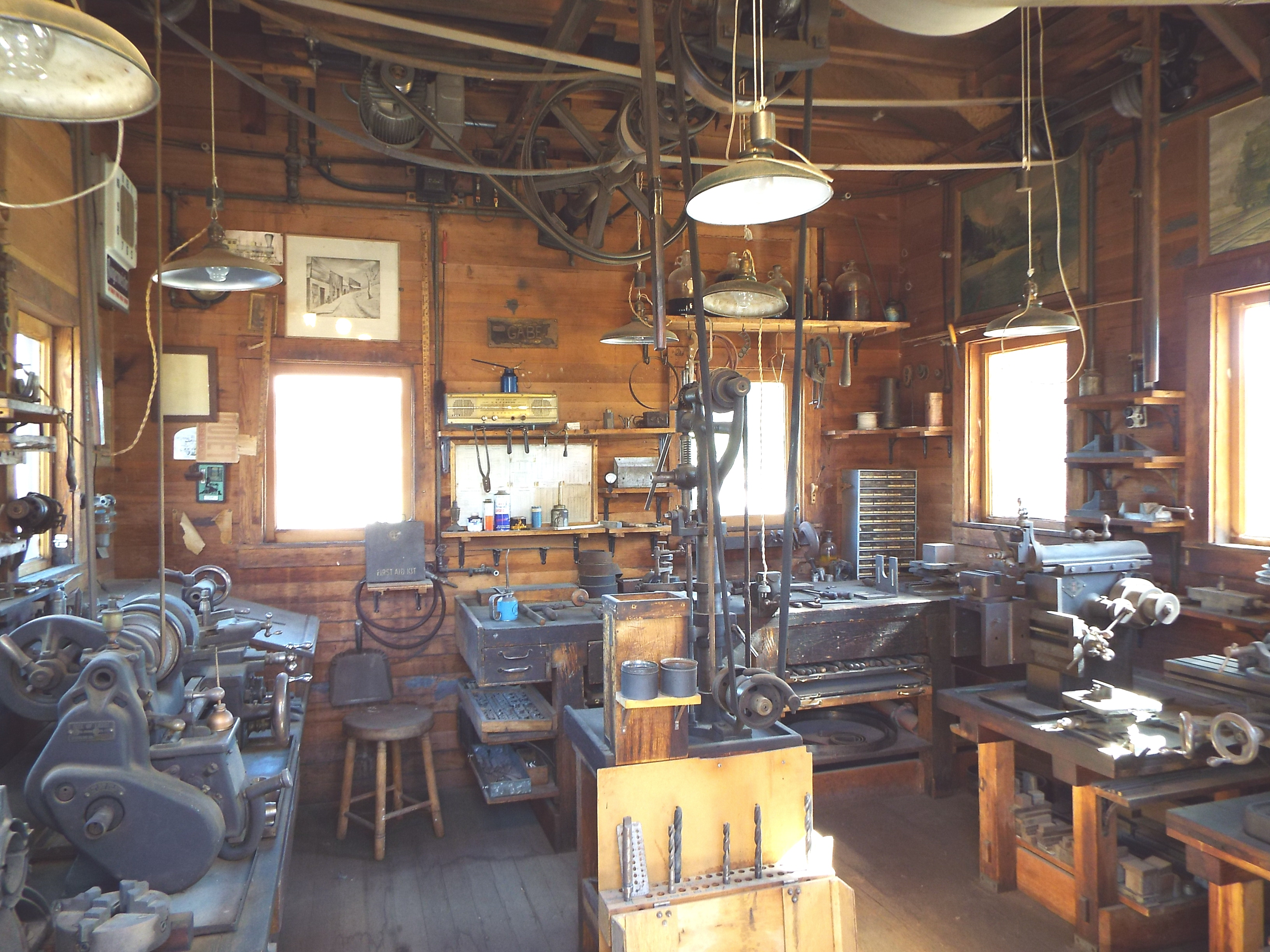
Inside the Walter "Gabe" Brooks Machine Shop.

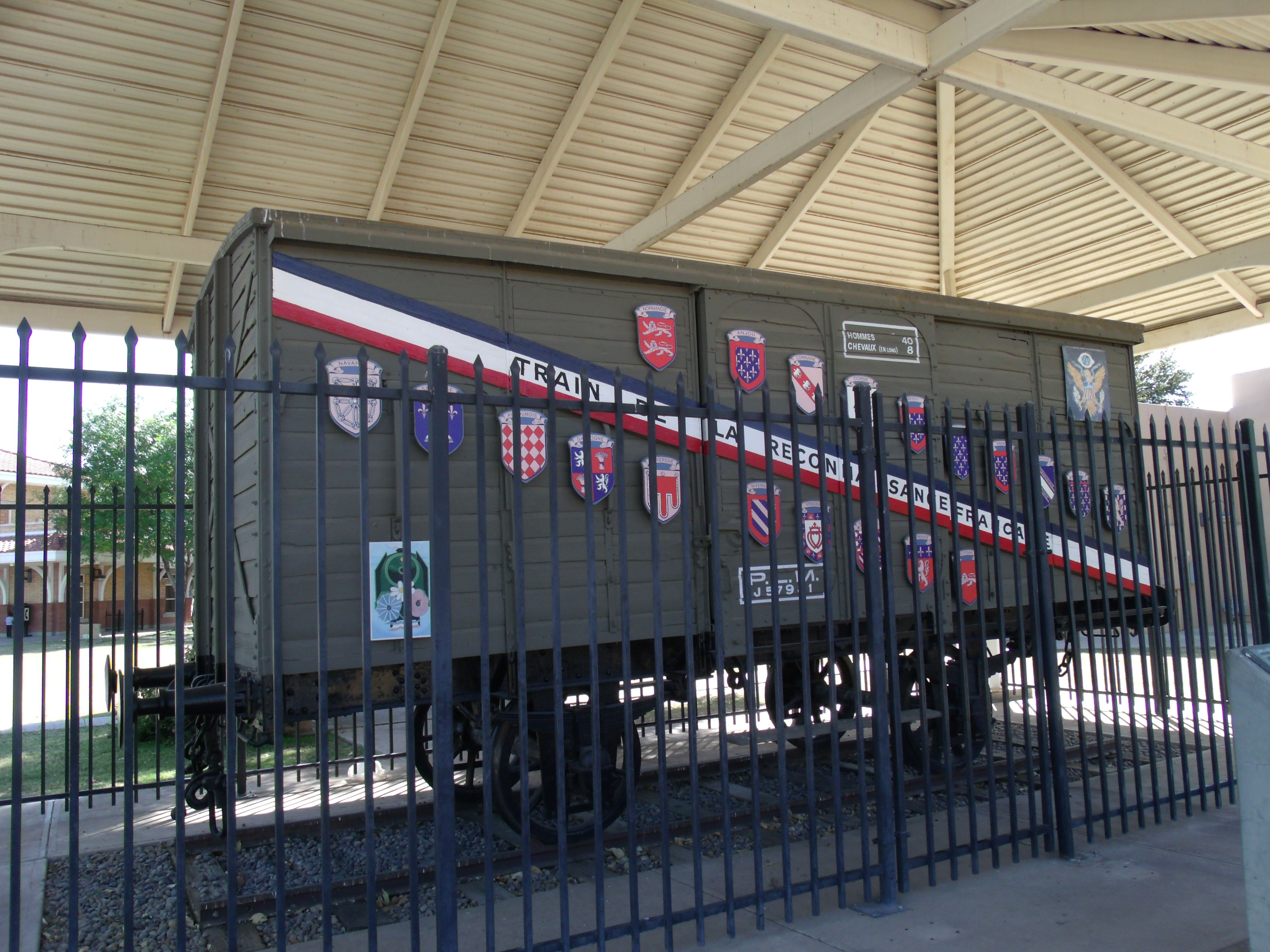
Boxcar of a "Merci Train" a.k.a. the "French Gratitude Train" (one of 49), built in 1949.

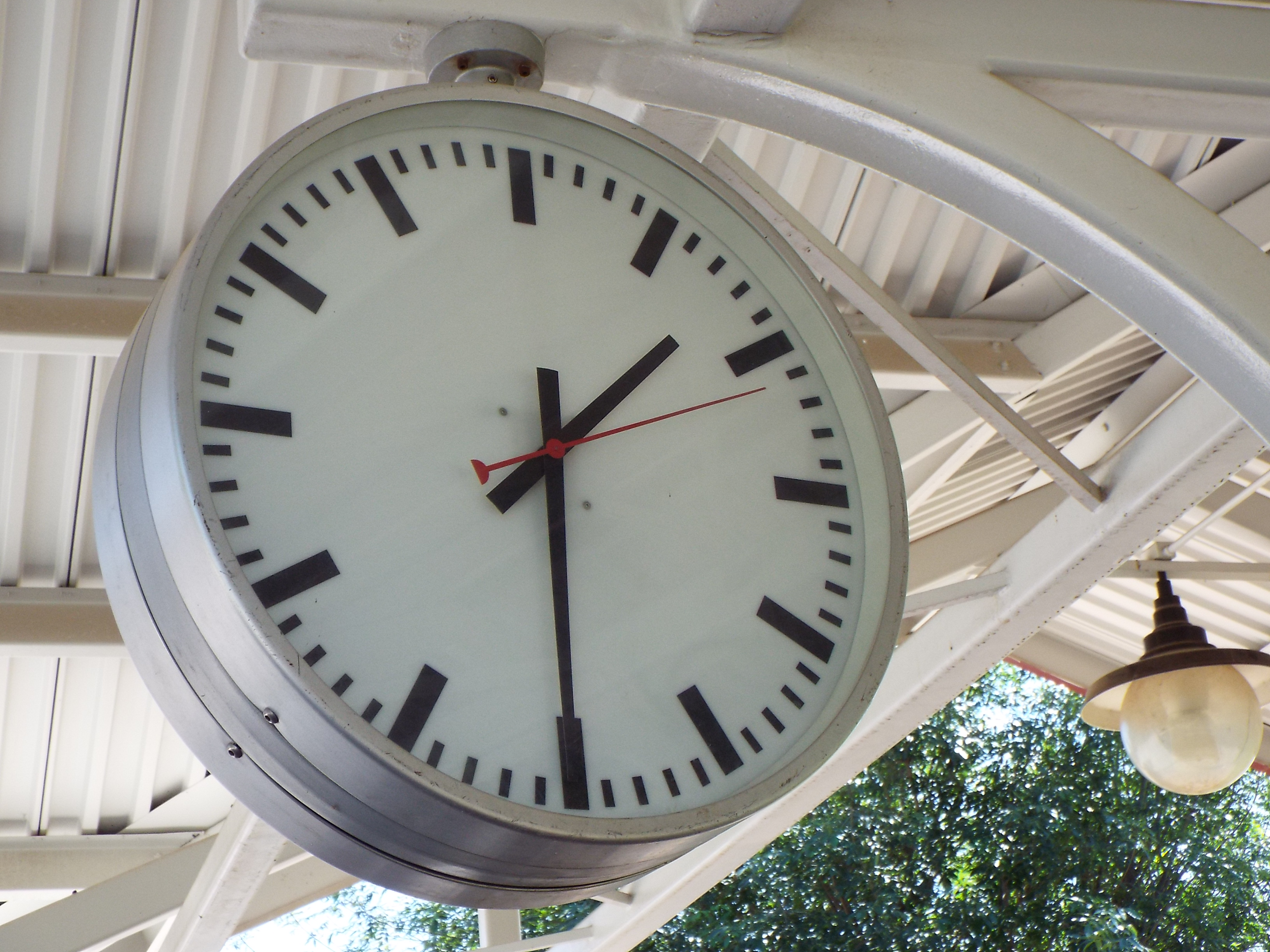
The Swiss Railway Clock donated to the McCormick-Stillman Railroad Park by the City of Interlaken, Switzerland. This was done in commemoration of the sister cities partnership of the cities of Interlaken and Scottsdale. The Swiss Railway Clock was designed in 1944 by Hans Hilfiker and was used by the Swiss federal Railways as a station clock.

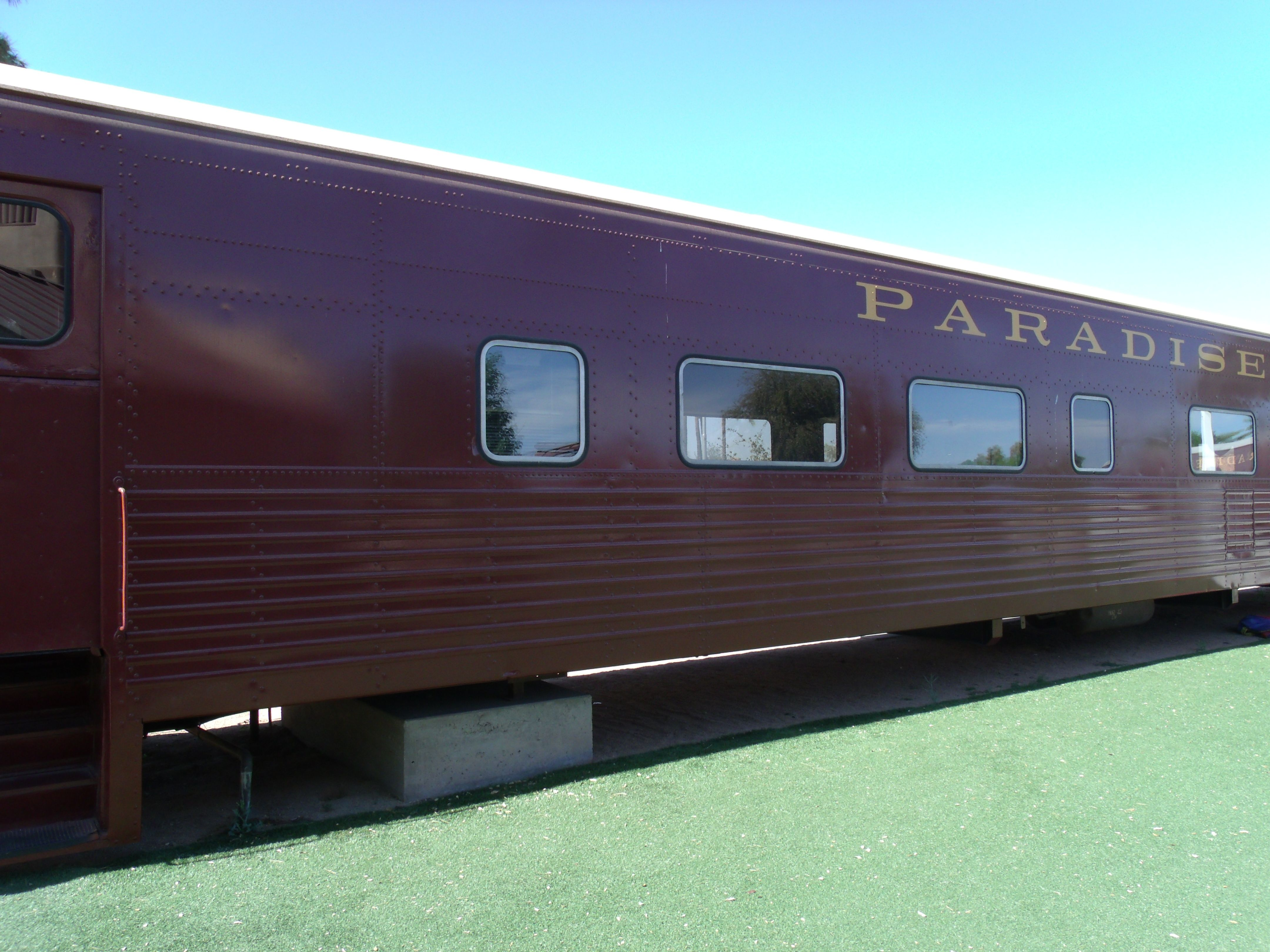
Dining Car in Stillman Railroad Park.

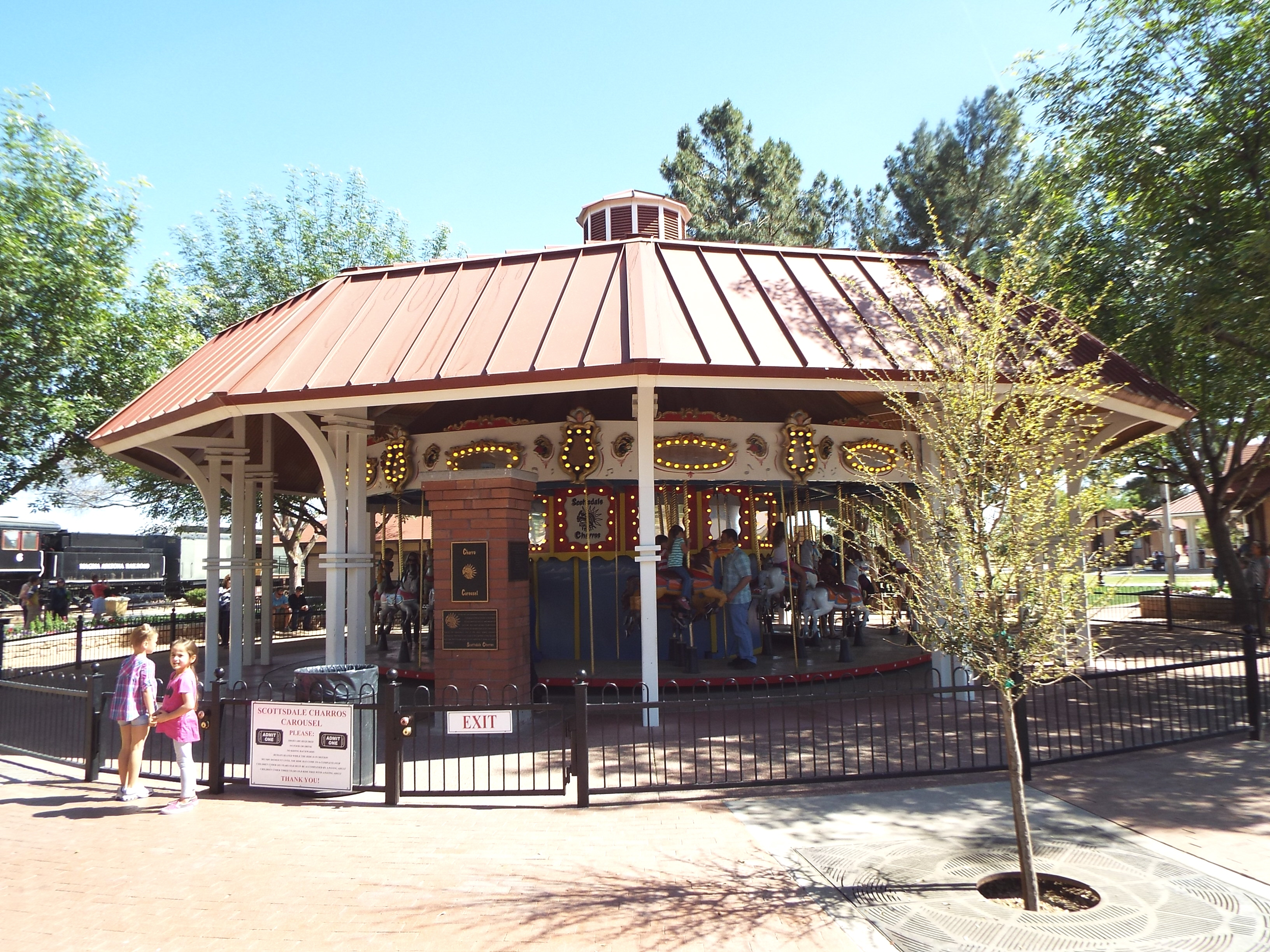
The Charro Carousal, built in 1950 and located in the McCormick-Stillman Railroad Park.

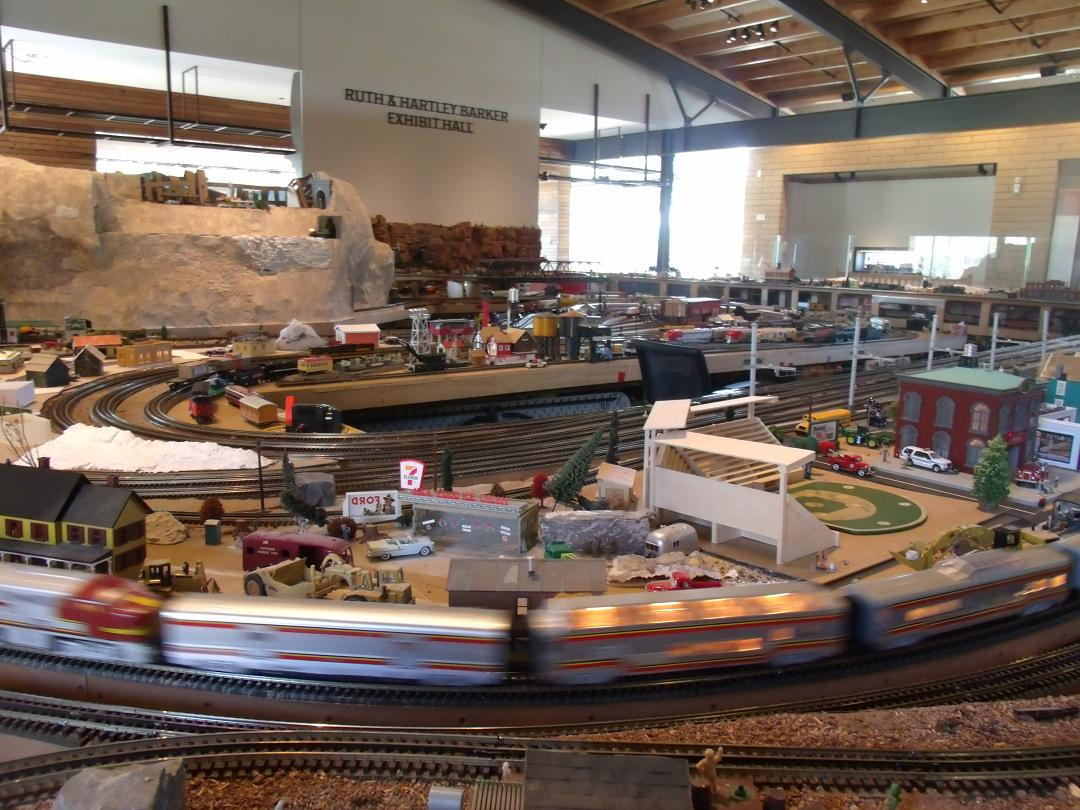
Scottsdale Model Railroad Club HO scale model train layout housed in the McCormick Ranch Bunkhouse.

== See also ==
- National Register of Historic Places listings in Maricopa County, Arizona
